

306001–306100 

|-bgcolor=#C2FFFF
| 306001 ||  || — || October 15, 2009 || La Sagra || OAM Obs. || L4 || align=right | 10 km || 
|-id=002 bgcolor=#E9E9E9
| 306002 ||  || — || November 24, 2000 || Kitt Peak || Spacewatch || GEF || align=right | 1.6 km || 
|-id=003 bgcolor=#C2FFFF
| 306003 ||  || — || November 16, 2009 || Mount Lemmon || Mount Lemmon Survey || L4 || align=right | 11 km || 
|-id=004 bgcolor=#E9E9E9
| 306004 ||  || — || February 8, 2010 || WISE || WISE || — || align=right | 2.2 km || 
|-id=005 bgcolor=#d6d6d6
| 306005 ||  || — || February 8, 2010 || WISE || WISE || IMH || align=right | 4.9 km || 
|-id=006 bgcolor=#fefefe
| 306006 ||  || — || February 9, 2010 || Kitt Peak || Spacewatch || — || align=right data-sort-value="0.88" | 880 m || 
|-id=007 bgcolor=#fefefe
| 306007 ||  || — || February 14, 2010 || Kitt Peak || Spacewatch || — || align=right data-sort-value="0.92" | 920 m || 
|-id=008 bgcolor=#fefefe
| 306008 ||  || — || February 14, 2010 || Kitt Peak || Spacewatch || — || align=right | 2.3 km || 
|-id=009 bgcolor=#fefefe
| 306009 ||  || — || February 15, 2010 || Kitt Peak || Spacewatch || — || align=right data-sort-value="0.70" | 700 m || 
|-id=010 bgcolor=#E9E9E9
| 306010 ||  || — || February 15, 2010 || WISE || WISE || PAL || align=right | 3.1 km || 
|-id=011 bgcolor=#fefefe
| 306011 ||  || — || February 15, 2010 || Kitt Peak || Spacewatch || ERI || align=right | 1.8 km || 
|-id=012 bgcolor=#fefefe
| 306012 ||  || — || February 15, 2010 || Kitt Peak || Spacewatch || V || align=right data-sort-value="0.67" | 670 m || 
|-id=013 bgcolor=#fefefe
| 306013 ||  || — || February 15, 2010 || Catalina || CSS || H || align=right data-sort-value="0.78" | 780 m || 
|-id=014 bgcolor=#E9E9E9
| 306014 ||  || — || February 16, 2010 || Kitt Peak || Spacewatch || — || align=right | 1.9 km || 
|-id=015 bgcolor=#fefefe
| 306015 ||  || — || February 16, 2010 || WISE || WISE || V || align=right | 2.2 km || 
|-id=016 bgcolor=#E9E9E9
| 306016 ||  || — || February 18, 2010 || WISE || WISE || — || align=right | 2.1 km || 
|-id=017 bgcolor=#fefefe
| 306017 ||  || — || February 18, 2010 || WISE || WISE || — || align=right | 3.0 km || 
|-id=018 bgcolor=#E9E9E9
| 306018 ||  || — || February 19, 2010 || WISE || WISE || KON || align=right | 3.4 km || 
|-id=019 bgcolor=#d6d6d6
| 306019 Duren ||  ||  || February 18, 2010 || WISE || WISE || — || align=right | 3.6 km || 
|-id=020 bgcolor=#fefefe
| 306020 Kormilov ||  ||  || February 22, 2010 || Zelenchukskaya || T. V. Kryachko || H || align=right data-sort-value="0.84" | 840 m || 
|-id=021 bgcolor=#fefefe
| 306021 ||  || — || February 17, 2010 || Kitt Peak || Spacewatch || — || align=right | 1.1 km || 
|-id=022 bgcolor=#E9E9E9
| 306022 ||  || — || February 27, 2010 || WISE || WISE || — || align=right | 4.3 km || 
|-id=023 bgcolor=#E9E9E9
| 306023 ||  || — || February 28, 2010 || WISE || WISE || — || align=right | 3.6 km || 
|-id=024 bgcolor=#E9E9E9
| 306024 ||  || — || February 18, 2010 || Mount Lemmon || Mount Lemmon Survey || JUN || align=right | 1.4 km || 
|-id=025 bgcolor=#fefefe
| 306025 ||  || — || March 12, 2010 || Mount Lemmon || Mount Lemmon Survey || MAS || align=right data-sort-value="0.93" | 930 m || 
|-id=026 bgcolor=#fefefe
| 306026 ||  || — || March 12, 2010 || Kitt Peak || Spacewatch || — || align=right data-sort-value="0.72" | 720 m || 
|-id=027 bgcolor=#fefefe
| 306027 ||  || — || October 7, 2004 || Kitt Peak || Spacewatch || — || align=right | 1.0 km || 
|-id=028 bgcolor=#fefefe
| 306028 ||  || — || August 24, 2001 || Anderson Mesa || LONEOS || — || align=right data-sort-value="0.80" | 800 m || 
|-id=029 bgcolor=#E9E9E9
| 306029 ||  || — || March 12, 2010 || Kitt Peak || Spacewatch || — || align=right | 2.2 km || 
|-id=030 bgcolor=#fefefe
| 306030 ||  || — || March 12, 2010 || Kitt Peak || Spacewatch || — || align=right data-sort-value="0.98" | 980 m || 
|-id=031 bgcolor=#fefefe
| 306031 ||  || — || March 15, 2010 || Kitt Peak || Spacewatch || — || align=right | 2.3 km || 
|-id=032 bgcolor=#E9E9E9
| 306032 ||  || — || March 15, 2010 || Kitt Peak || Spacewatch || ADE || align=right | 2.1 km || 
|-id=033 bgcolor=#fefefe
| 306033 ||  || — || March 13, 2010 || Catalina || CSS || — || align=right | 2.0 km || 
|-id=034 bgcolor=#fefefe
| 306034 ||  || — || July 22, 2004 || Mauna Kea || C. Veillet || — || align=right data-sort-value="0.85" | 850 m || 
|-id=035 bgcolor=#fefefe
| 306035 ||  || — || March 14, 2010 || Kitt Peak || Spacewatch || — || align=right | 1.5 km || 
|-id=036 bgcolor=#fefefe
| 306036 ||  || — || October 10, 2004 || Kitt Peak || Spacewatch || — || align=right data-sort-value="0.94" | 940 m || 
|-id=037 bgcolor=#fefefe
| 306037 ||  || — || March 15, 2010 || Mount Lemmon || Mount Lemmon Survey || — || align=right data-sort-value="0.73" | 730 m || 
|-id=038 bgcolor=#fefefe
| 306038 ||  || — || March 12, 2010 || Kitt Peak || Spacewatch || — || align=right data-sort-value="0.73" | 730 m || 
|-id=039 bgcolor=#fefefe
| 306039 ||  || — || March 12, 2010 || Kitt Peak || Spacewatch || NYS || align=right data-sort-value="0.78" | 780 m || 
|-id=040 bgcolor=#fefefe
| 306040 ||  || — || February 21, 2007 || Catalina || CSS || H || align=right data-sort-value="0.80" | 800 m || 
|-id=041 bgcolor=#fefefe
| 306041 ||  || — || September 10, 2007 || Catalina || CSS || V || align=right data-sort-value="0.79" | 790 m || 
|-id=042 bgcolor=#fefefe
| 306042 ||  || — || March 15, 2010 || Catalina || CSS || H || align=right data-sort-value="0.91" | 910 m || 
|-id=043 bgcolor=#fefefe
| 306043 ||  || — || March 15, 2010 || Mount Lemmon || Mount Lemmon Survey || — || align=right | 1.6 km || 
|-id=044 bgcolor=#d6d6d6
| 306044 ||  || — || March 3, 2010 || WISE || WISE || — || align=right | 3.4 km || 
|-id=045 bgcolor=#fefefe
| 306045 ||  || — || March 12, 2003 || Kitt Peak || Spacewatch || FLO || align=right data-sort-value="0.61" | 610 m || 
|-id=046 bgcolor=#fefefe
| 306046 ||  || — || March 17, 2010 || Kitt Peak || Spacewatch || — || align=right data-sort-value="0.80" | 800 m || 
|-id=047 bgcolor=#fefefe
| 306047 ||  || — || March 25, 2010 || Kitt Peak || Spacewatch || MAS || align=right data-sort-value="0.81" | 810 m || 
|-id=048 bgcolor=#fefefe
| 306048 ||  || — || March 25, 2010 || Kitt Peak || Spacewatch || FLO || align=right data-sort-value="0.59" | 590 m || 
|-id=049 bgcolor=#fefefe
| 306049 ||  || — || March 21, 2010 || Mount Lemmon || Mount Lemmon Survey || FLO || align=right data-sort-value="0.60" | 600 m || 
|-id=050 bgcolor=#fefefe
| 306050 ||  || — || March 21, 2010 || Mount Lemmon || Mount Lemmon Survey || NYS || align=right data-sort-value="0.86" | 860 m || 
|-id=051 bgcolor=#fefefe
| 306051 ||  || — || March 25, 2010 || Mount Lemmon || Mount Lemmon Survey || — || align=right data-sort-value="0.94" | 940 m || 
|-id=052 bgcolor=#fefefe
| 306052 ||  || — || April 8, 2010 || Mayhill || A. Lowe || H || align=right data-sort-value="0.79" | 790 m || 
|-id=053 bgcolor=#fefefe
| 306053 ||  || — || April 4, 2010 || Kitt Peak || Spacewatch || FLO || align=right data-sort-value="0.77" | 770 m || 
|-id=054 bgcolor=#fefefe
| 306054 ||  || — || April 5, 2010 || Kitt Peak || Spacewatch || V || align=right data-sort-value="0.98" | 980 m || 
|-id=055 bgcolor=#E9E9E9
| 306055 ||  || — || April 6, 2010 || Kitt Peak || Spacewatch || — || align=right | 1.9 km || 
|-id=056 bgcolor=#E9E9E9
| 306056 ||  || — || April 8, 2010 || Sandlot || G. Hug || — || align=right | 1.4 km || 
|-id=057 bgcolor=#fefefe
| 306057 ||  || — || April 4, 2010 || Catalina || CSS || — || align=right data-sort-value="0.93" | 930 m || 
|-id=058 bgcolor=#fefefe
| 306058 ||  || — || November 7, 2008 || Mount Lemmon || Mount Lemmon Survey || — || align=right data-sort-value="0.89" | 890 m || 
|-id=059 bgcolor=#fefefe
| 306059 ||  || — || April 9, 2010 || Kachina || J. Hobart || H || align=right data-sort-value="0.54" | 540 m || 
|-id=060 bgcolor=#fefefe
| 306060 ||  || — || April 8, 2010 || Catalina || CSS || — || align=right | 1.4 km || 
|-id=061 bgcolor=#E9E9E9
| 306061 ||  || — || April 6, 2010 || Catalina || CSS || — || align=right | 2.9 km || 
|-id=062 bgcolor=#fefefe
| 306062 ||  || — || April 7, 2010 || Mount Lemmon || Mount Lemmon Survey || NYS || align=right | 1.0 km || 
|-id=063 bgcolor=#fefefe
| 306063 ||  || — || February 26, 2007 || Catalina || CSS || H || align=right data-sort-value="0.91" | 910 m || 
|-id=064 bgcolor=#d6d6d6
| 306064 ||  || — || November 25, 2006 || Kitt Peak || Spacewatch || — || align=right | 3.7 km || 
|-id=065 bgcolor=#E9E9E9
| 306065 ||  || — || April 4, 2010 || Kitt Peak || Spacewatch || — || align=right | 1.7 km || 
|-id=066 bgcolor=#fefefe
| 306066 ||  || — || April 10, 2010 || Mount Lemmon || Mount Lemmon Survey || MAS || align=right data-sort-value="0.78" | 780 m || 
|-id=067 bgcolor=#fefefe
| 306067 ||  || — || April 4, 2010 || Kitt Peak || Spacewatch || V || align=right data-sort-value="0.93" | 930 m || 
|-id=068 bgcolor=#fefefe
| 306068 ||  || — || April 7, 2010 || Kitt Peak || Spacewatch || MAS || align=right data-sort-value="0.96" | 960 m || 
|-id=069 bgcolor=#fefefe
| 306069 ||  || — || April 7, 2010 || Kitt Peak || Spacewatch || V || align=right data-sort-value="0.98" | 980 m || 
|-id=070 bgcolor=#fefefe
| 306070 ||  || — || April 7, 2010 || Mount Lemmon || Mount Lemmon Survey || — || align=right | 1.6 km || 
|-id=071 bgcolor=#E9E9E9
| 306071 ||  || — || April 8, 2010 || Kitt Peak || Spacewatch || — || align=right data-sort-value="0.86" | 860 m || 
|-id=072 bgcolor=#fefefe
| 306072 ||  || — || April 29, 2003 || Anderson Mesa || LONEOS || NYS || align=right data-sort-value="0.66" | 660 m || 
|-id=073 bgcolor=#fefefe
| 306073 ||  || — || August 26, 2000 || Socorro || LINEAR || — || align=right data-sort-value="0.91" | 910 m || 
|-id=074 bgcolor=#fefefe
| 306074 ||  || — || April 10, 2010 || Kitt Peak || Spacewatch || — || align=right | 1.7 km || 
|-id=075 bgcolor=#fefefe
| 306075 ||  || — || April 11, 2010 || Kitt Peak || Spacewatch || SUL || align=right | 2.1 km || 
|-id=076 bgcolor=#fefefe
| 306076 ||  || — || March 3, 2006 || Kitt Peak || Spacewatch || MAS || align=right data-sort-value="0.77" | 770 m || 
|-id=077 bgcolor=#fefefe
| 306077 ||  || — || September 22, 2004 || Kitt Peak || Spacewatch || NYS || align=right | 1.3 km || 
|-id=078 bgcolor=#E9E9E9
| 306078 ||  || — || April 15, 2010 || Kitt Peak || Spacewatch || — || align=right | 2.3 km || 
|-id=079 bgcolor=#fefefe
| 306079 ||  || — || April 10, 2010 || Kitt Peak || Spacewatch || FLO || align=right data-sort-value="0.82" | 820 m || 
|-id=080 bgcolor=#fefefe
| 306080 ||  || — || April 6, 2010 || Mount Lemmon || Mount Lemmon Survey || — || align=right | 2.0 km || 
|-id=081 bgcolor=#fefefe
| 306081 ||  || — || April 7, 2010 || Mount Lemmon || Mount Lemmon Survey || FLO || align=right data-sort-value="0.72" | 720 m || 
|-id=082 bgcolor=#fefefe
| 306082 ||  || — || April 8, 2010 || Mount Lemmon || Mount Lemmon Survey || V || align=right data-sort-value="0.58" | 580 m || 
|-id=083 bgcolor=#fefefe
| 306083 ||  || — || April 10, 2010 || Westfield || ARO || — || align=right | 1.3 km || 
|-id=084 bgcolor=#E9E9E9
| 306084 ||  || — || April 15, 2010 || WISE || WISE || HOF || align=right | 2.8 km || 
|-id=085 bgcolor=#fefefe
| 306085 ||  || — || April 5, 2010 || Kitt Peak || Spacewatch || FLO || align=right data-sort-value="0.67" | 670 m || 
|-id=086 bgcolor=#fefefe
| 306086 ||  || — || April 9, 2010 || Mount Lemmon || Mount Lemmon Survey || V || align=right data-sort-value="0.86" | 860 m || 
|-id=087 bgcolor=#E9E9E9
| 306087 ||  || — || April 15, 2010 || Mount Lemmon || Mount Lemmon Survey || — || align=right | 2.7 km || 
|-id=088 bgcolor=#d6d6d6
| 306088 ||  || — || April 16, 2010 || WISE || WISE || — || align=right | 4.1 km || 
|-id=089 bgcolor=#fefefe
| 306089 ||  || — || April 17, 2010 || Mount Lemmon || Mount Lemmon Survey || — || align=right data-sort-value="0.93" | 930 m || 
|-id=090 bgcolor=#E9E9E9
| 306090 ||  || — || April 19, 2010 || WISE || WISE || HOF || align=right | 4.5 km || 
|-id=091 bgcolor=#d6d6d6
| 306091 ||  || — || April 20, 2010 || WISE || WISE || — || align=right | 6.4 km || 
|-id=092 bgcolor=#d6d6d6
| 306092 ||  || — || April 22, 2010 || WISE || WISE || VER || align=right | 3.6 km || 
|-id=093 bgcolor=#d6d6d6
| 306093 ||  || — || April 23, 2010 || WISE || WISE || TRP || align=right | 4.1 km || 
|-id=094 bgcolor=#d6d6d6
| 306094 ||  || — || April 23, 2010 || WISE || WISE || — || align=right | 3.4 km || 
|-id=095 bgcolor=#d6d6d6
| 306095 ||  || — || April 24, 2010 || WISE || WISE || — || align=right | 5.1 km || 
|-id=096 bgcolor=#d6d6d6
| 306096 ||  || — || April 24, 2010 || WISE || WISE || — || align=right | 3.6 km || 
|-id=097 bgcolor=#d6d6d6
| 306097 ||  || — || April 22, 2009 || Kitt Peak || Spacewatch || — || align=right | 4.3 km || 
|-id=098 bgcolor=#E9E9E9
| 306098 ||  || — || April 26, 2010 || WISE || WISE || HOF || align=right | 3.5 km || 
|-id=099 bgcolor=#E9E9E9
| 306099 ||  || — || April 20, 2010 || Kitt Peak || Spacewatch || — || align=right | 3.4 km || 
|-id=100 bgcolor=#E9E9E9
| 306100 ||  || — || April 20, 2010 || Kitt Peak || Spacewatch || IAN || align=right | 1.4 km || 
|}

306101–306200 

|-bgcolor=#fefefe
| 306101 ||  || — || August 6, 2007 || Lulin Observatory || LUSS || V || align=right data-sort-value="0.88" | 880 m || 
|-id=102 bgcolor=#E9E9E9
| 306102 ||  || — || April 28, 2010 || WISE || WISE || — || align=right | 2.6 km || 
|-id=103 bgcolor=#fefefe
| 306103 ||  || — || April 26, 2003 || Kitt Peak || Spacewatch || — || align=right data-sort-value="0.86" | 860 m || 
|-id=104 bgcolor=#fefefe
| 306104 ||  || — || April 26, 2010 || Mount Lemmon || Mount Lemmon Survey || — || align=right data-sort-value="0.80" | 800 m || 
|-id=105 bgcolor=#E9E9E9
| 306105 ||  || — || May 5, 2010 || Mayhill || iTelescope Obs. || — || align=right | 1.0 km || 
|-id=106 bgcolor=#d6d6d6
| 306106 ||  || — || May 3, 2010 || Kitt Peak || Spacewatch || — || align=right | 2.2 km || 
|-id=107 bgcolor=#fefefe
| 306107 ||  || — || March 18, 2010 || Kitt Peak || Spacewatch || NYS || align=right data-sort-value="0.79" | 790 m || 
|-id=108 bgcolor=#fefefe
| 306108 ||  || — || May 6, 2010 || Mount Lemmon || Mount Lemmon Survey || — || align=right | 1.2 km || 
|-id=109 bgcolor=#fefefe
| 306109 ||  || — || May 6, 2010 || Mount Lemmon || Mount Lemmon Survey || — || align=right data-sort-value="0.75" | 750 m || 
|-id=110 bgcolor=#E9E9E9
| 306110 ||  || — || May 4, 2010 || Siding Spring || SSS || — || align=right | 2.0 km || 
|-id=111 bgcolor=#d6d6d6
| 306111 ||  || — || May 9, 2010 || Mount Lemmon || Mount Lemmon Survey || — || align=right | 3.0 km || 
|-id=112 bgcolor=#E9E9E9
| 306112 ||  || — || May 4, 2010 || Siding Spring || SSS || GER || align=right | 2.4 km || 
|-id=113 bgcolor=#fefefe
| 306113 ||  || — || April 19, 2006 || Mount Lemmon || Mount Lemmon Survey || V || align=right data-sort-value="0.82" | 820 m || 
|-id=114 bgcolor=#fefefe
| 306114 ||  || — || May 3, 2010 || Kitt Peak || Spacewatch || NYS || align=right data-sort-value="0.65" | 650 m || 
|-id=115 bgcolor=#fefefe
| 306115 ||  || — || May 3, 2010 || Kitt Peak || Spacewatch || MAS || align=right data-sort-value="0.91" | 910 m || 
|-id=116 bgcolor=#d6d6d6
| 306116 ||  || — || May 8, 2010 || WISE || WISE || THM || align=right | 3.5 km || 
|-id=117 bgcolor=#fefefe
| 306117 ||  || — || May 8, 2010 || Mount Lemmon || Mount Lemmon Survey || — || align=right data-sort-value="0.91" | 910 m || 
|-id=118 bgcolor=#fefefe
| 306118 ||  || — || May 8, 2010 || Mount Lemmon || Mount Lemmon Survey || V || align=right data-sort-value="0.88" | 880 m || 
|-id=119 bgcolor=#fefefe
| 306119 ||  || — || May 4, 2010 || Kitt Peak || Spacewatch || V || align=right data-sort-value="0.77" | 770 m || 
|-id=120 bgcolor=#fefefe
| 306120 ||  || — || May 4, 2010 || Kitt Peak || Spacewatch || — || align=right data-sort-value="0.78" | 780 m || 
|-id=121 bgcolor=#fefefe
| 306121 ||  || — || May 5, 2010 || Jarnac || Jarnac Obs. || H || align=right data-sort-value="0.57" | 570 m || 
|-id=122 bgcolor=#fefefe
| 306122 ||  || — || September 26, 2000 || Anderson Mesa || LONEOS || H || align=right data-sort-value="0.78" | 780 m || 
|-id=123 bgcolor=#fefefe
| 306123 ||  || — || November 22, 2008 || Kitt Peak || Spacewatch || V || align=right data-sort-value="0.76" | 760 m || 
|-id=124 bgcolor=#fefefe
| 306124 ||  || — || May 12, 2010 || Nogales || Tenagra II Obs. || FLO || align=right data-sort-value="0.77" | 770 m || 
|-id=125 bgcolor=#fefefe
| 306125 ||  || — || August 20, 2003 || Campo Imperatore || CINEOS || V || align=right data-sort-value="0.89" | 890 m || 
|-id=126 bgcolor=#d6d6d6
| 306126 ||  || — || May 11, 2010 || WISE || WISE || — || align=right | 3.3 km || 
|-id=127 bgcolor=#E9E9E9
| 306127 ||  || — || May 11, 2010 || WISE || WISE || — || align=right | 3.7 km || 
|-id=128 bgcolor=#d6d6d6
| 306128 Pipher ||  ||  || May 12, 2010 || WISE || WISE || EOS || align=right | 4.9 km || 
|-id=129 bgcolor=#fefefe
| 306129 ||  || — || May 7, 2010 || Mount Lemmon || Mount Lemmon Survey || V || align=right data-sort-value="0.79" | 790 m || 
|-id=130 bgcolor=#E9E9E9
| 306130 ||  || — || May 12, 2010 || Kitt Peak || Spacewatch || PAD || align=right | 3.4 km || 
|-id=131 bgcolor=#fefefe
| 306131 ||  || — || May 13, 1999 || Socorro || LINEAR || — || align=right | 1.2 km || 
|-id=132 bgcolor=#E9E9E9
| 306132 ||  || — || May 6, 2010 || Mount Lemmon || Mount Lemmon Survey || PAE || align=right | 2.7 km || 
|-id=133 bgcolor=#fefefe
| 306133 ||  || — || May 4, 2010 || Siding Spring || SSS || — || align=right | 1.1 km || 
|-id=134 bgcolor=#fefefe
| 306134 ||  || — || May 12, 2010 || Mount Lemmon || Mount Lemmon Survey || — || align=right data-sort-value="0.87" | 870 m || 
|-id=135 bgcolor=#d6d6d6
| 306135 ||  || — || May 13, 2010 || WISE || WISE || — || align=right | 1.9 km || 
|-id=136 bgcolor=#d6d6d6
| 306136 ||  || — || May 14, 2010 || WISE || WISE || — || align=right | 4.5 km || 
|-id=137 bgcolor=#E9E9E9
| 306137 ||  || — || May 3, 2010 || Kitt Peak || Spacewatch || EUN || align=right | 2.0 km || 
|-id=138 bgcolor=#fefefe
| 306138 ||  || — || March 4, 2006 || Kitt Peak || Spacewatch || NYS || align=right data-sort-value="0.87" | 870 m || 
|-id=139 bgcolor=#fefefe
| 306139 ||  || — || February 20, 2006 || Kitt Peak || Spacewatch || — || align=right data-sort-value="0.91" | 910 m || 
|-id=140 bgcolor=#d6d6d6
| 306140 ||  || — || May 17, 2010 || Nogales || Tenagra II Obs. || — || align=right | 4.3 km || 
|-id=141 bgcolor=#fefefe
| 306141 ||  || — || May 18, 2010 || Siding Spring || SSS || — || align=right | 1.1 km || 
|-id=142 bgcolor=#d6d6d6
| 306142 ||  || — || May 17, 2010 || WISE || WISE || EOS || align=right | 4.7 km || 
|-id=143 bgcolor=#d6d6d6
| 306143 ||  || — || May 17, 2010 || WISE || WISE || URS || align=right | 4.9 km || 
|-id=144 bgcolor=#E9E9E9
| 306144 ||  || — || May 21, 2010 || Catalina || CSS || BAR || align=right | 2.3 km || 
|-id=145 bgcolor=#E9E9E9
| 306145 ||  || — || May 19, 2010 || Kitt Peak || Spacewatch || — || align=right | 2.5 km || 
|-id=146 bgcolor=#E9E9E9
| 306146 ||  || — || November 28, 1999 || Kitt Peak || Spacewatch || — || align=right data-sort-value="0.91" | 910 m || 
|-id=147 bgcolor=#d6d6d6
| 306147 ||  || — || November 1, 2006 || Mount Lemmon || Mount Lemmon Survey || — || align=right | 4.9 km || 
|-id=148 bgcolor=#E9E9E9
| 306148 ||  || — || May 21, 2010 || Catalina || CSS || — || align=right | 1.7 km || 
|-id=149 bgcolor=#fefefe
| 306149 ||  || — || May 17, 2010 || Mount Lemmon || Mount Lemmon Survey || V || align=right data-sort-value="0.78" | 780 m || 
|-id=150 bgcolor=#fefefe
| 306150 ||  || — || May 21, 2010 || Catalina || CSS || — || align=right | 1.3 km || 
|-id=151 bgcolor=#d6d6d6
| 306151 ||  || — || May 25, 2010 || WISE || WISE || — || align=right | 3.0 km || 
|-id=152 bgcolor=#d6d6d6
| 306152 ||  || — || May 28, 2010 || WISE || WISE || — || align=right | 4.2 km || 
|-id=153 bgcolor=#E9E9E9
| 306153 ||  || — || May 19, 2010 || La Sagra || OAM Obs. || INO || align=right | 1.4 km || 
|-id=154 bgcolor=#fefefe
| 306154 ||  || — || May 21, 2010 || Catalina || CSS || — || align=right | 1.2 km || 
|-id=155 bgcolor=#d6d6d6
| 306155 ||  || — || July 3, 2005 || Palomar || NEAT || TIR || align=right | 3.7 km || 
|-id=156 bgcolor=#E9E9E9
| 306156 ||  || — || May 21, 2010 || Catalina || CSS || RAF || align=right | 1.3 km || 
|-id=157 bgcolor=#E9E9E9
| 306157 ||  || — || June 1, 2010 || Nogales || Tenagra II Obs. || — || align=right | 3.2 km || 
|-id=158 bgcolor=#E9E9E9
| 306158 ||  || — || June 3, 2010 || Kitt Peak || Spacewatch || — || align=right | 1.3 km || 
|-id=159 bgcolor=#fefefe
| 306159 ||  || — || June 1, 2003 || Cerro Tololo || M. W. Buie || V || align=right data-sort-value="0.80" | 800 m || 
|-id=160 bgcolor=#fefefe
| 306160 ||  || — || June 4, 2010 || Nogales || Tenagra II Obs. || — || align=right | 1.2 km || 
|-id=161 bgcolor=#E9E9E9
| 306161 ||  || — || June 1, 2010 || Catalina || CSS || — || align=right | 2.0 km || 
|-id=162 bgcolor=#E9E9E9
| 306162 ||  || — || June 13, 2010 || Kitt Peak || Spacewatch || — || align=right | 1.8 km || 
|-id=163 bgcolor=#E9E9E9
| 306163 ||  || — || June 21, 2010 || Nogales || Tenagra II Obs. || MAR || align=right | 1.6 km || 
|-id=164 bgcolor=#E9E9E9
| 306164 ||  || — || June 25, 2010 || WISE || WISE || — || align=right | 1.4 km || 
|-id=165 bgcolor=#E9E9E9
| 306165 ||  || — || June 27, 2010 || WISE || WISE || — || align=right | 3.0 km || 
|-id=166 bgcolor=#d6d6d6
| 306166 ||  || — || June 29, 2010 || WISE || WISE || 3:2 || align=right | 5.2 km || 
|-id=167 bgcolor=#d6d6d6
| 306167 ||  || — || July 3, 2005 || Catalina || CSS || BRA || align=right | 2.4 km || 
|-id=168 bgcolor=#E9E9E9
| 306168 ||  || — || June 20, 2010 || Mount Lemmon || Mount Lemmon Survey || — || align=right | 2.1 km || 
|-id=169 bgcolor=#E9E9E9
| 306169 ||  || — || July 5, 2010 || Kitt Peak || Spacewatch || BAR || align=right | 1.7 km || 
|-id=170 bgcolor=#E9E9E9
| 306170 ||  || — || July 5, 2010 || Mount Lemmon || Mount Lemmon Survey || — || align=right | 2.8 km || 
|-id=171 bgcolor=#E9E9E9
| 306171 ||  || — || July 5, 2010 || Mount Lemmon || Mount Lemmon Survey || — || align=right | 1.8 km || 
|-id=172 bgcolor=#fefefe
| 306172 ||  || — || July 4, 2010 || WISE || WISE || — || align=right | 2.4 km || 
|-id=173 bgcolor=#C7FF8F
| 306173 ||  || — || July 1, 2010 || WISE || WISE || unusualcritical || align=right | 8.4 km || 
|-id=174 bgcolor=#d6d6d6
| 306174 ||  || — || December 2, 2005 || Catalina || CSS || EUP || align=right | 5.2 km || 
|-id=175 bgcolor=#fefefe
| 306175 ||  || — || November 9, 2007 || Mount Lemmon || Mount Lemmon Survey || — || align=right | 1.1 km || 
|-id=176 bgcolor=#fefefe
| 306176 ||  || — || December 5, 2007 || Kitt Peak || Spacewatch || FLO || align=right data-sort-value="0.65" | 650 m || 
|-id=177 bgcolor=#C2FFFF
| 306177 ||  || — || June 13, 2005 || Mount Lemmon || Mount Lemmon Survey || L4 || align=right | 12 km || 
|-id=178 bgcolor=#C2FFFF
| 306178 ||  || — || March 13, 2002 || Palomar || NEAT || L4 || align=right | 11 km || 
|-id=179 bgcolor=#C2FFFF
| 306179 ||  || — || April 2, 2003 || Cerro Tololo || DLS || L4 || align=right | 8.6 km || 
|-id=180 bgcolor=#fefefe
| 306180 ||  || — || November 14, 1995 || Kitt Peak || Spacewatch || MAS || align=right data-sort-value="0.79" | 790 m || 
|-id=181 bgcolor=#fefefe
| 306181 ||  || — || October 21, 2006 || Kitt Peak || Spacewatch || — || align=right data-sort-value="0.74" | 740 m || 
|-id=182 bgcolor=#fefefe
| 306182 ||  || — || March 17, 2004 || Catalina || CSS || — || align=right | 1.2 km || 
|-id=183 bgcolor=#fefefe
| 306183 ||  || — || January 15, 2004 || Kitt Peak || Spacewatch || — || align=right data-sort-value="0.83" | 830 m || 
|-id=184 bgcolor=#E9E9E9
| 306184 ||  || — || November 6, 2005 || Mount Lemmon || Mount Lemmon Survey || — || align=right | 1.9 km || 
|-id=185 bgcolor=#E9E9E9
| 306185 ||  || — || October 26, 2000 || Kitt Peak || Spacewatch || — || align=right | 3.2 km || 
|-id=186 bgcolor=#E9E9E9
| 306186 ||  || — || November 12, 2007 || Catalina || CSS || — || align=right | 3.2 km || 
|-id=187 bgcolor=#d6d6d6
| 306187 ||  || — || January 26, 2003 || Palomar || NEAT || — || align=right | 7.6 km || 
|-id=188 bgcolor=#E9E9E9
| 306188 ||  || — || March 4, 2005 || Kitt Peak || Spacewatch || — || align=right | 3.0 km || 
|-id=189 bgcolor=#E9E9E9
| 306189 ||  || — || November 1, 2002 || Palomar || NEAT || — || align=right | 3.0 km || 
|-id=190 bgcolor=#fefefe
| 306190 ||  || — || January 2, 2009 || Mount Lemmon || Mount Lemmon Survey || — || align=right | 1.0 km || 
|-id=191 bgcolor=#fefefe
| 306191 ||  || — || December 28, 2008 || Piszkéstető || K. Sárneczky || MAS || align=right | 1.0 km || 
|-id=192 bgcolor=#d6d6d6
| 306192 ||  || — || December 2, 2008 || Kitt Peak || Spacewatch || — || align=right | 4.2 km || 
|-id=193 bgcolor=#fefefe
| 306193 ||  || — || November 2, 2008 || Mount Lemmon || Mount Lemmon Survey || NYS || align=right data-sort-value="0.91" | 910 m || 
|-id=194 bgcolor=#fefefe
| 306194 ||  || — || November 26, 2009 || Mount Lemmon || Mount Lemmon Survey || H || align=right data-sort-value="0.85" | 850 m || 
|-id=195 bgcolor=#fefefe
| 306195 ||  || — || November 20, 2000 || Kitt Peak || Spacewatch || NYS || align=right data-sort-value="0.76" | 760 m || 
|-id=196 bgcolor=#E9E9E9
| 306196 ||  || — || March 8, 2005 || Mount Lemmon || Mount Lemmon Survey || AGN || align=right | 1.5 km || 
|-id=197 bgcolor=#E9E9E9
| 306197 ||  || — || September 18, 2007 || Catalina || CSS || JUN || align=right | 1.3 km || 
|-id=198 bgcolor=#d6d6d6
| 306198 ||  || — || July 29, 2005 || Palomar || NEAT || HYG || align=right | 4.1 km || 
|-id=199 bgcolor=#d6d6d6
| 306199 ||  || — || February 12, 2008 || Kitt Peak || Spacewatch || 7:4 || align=right | 3.9 km || 
|-id=200 bgcolor=#C2FFFF
| 306200 ||  || — || March 12, 2008 || Kitt Peak || Spacewatch || L5 || align=right | 11 km || 
|}

306201–306300 

|-bgcolor=#E9E9E9
| 306201 ||  || — || April 21, 2006 || Catalina || CSS || — || align=right | 1.3 km || 
|-id=202 bgcolor=#d6d6d6
| 306202 ||  || — || January 31, 2009 || Mount Lemmon || Mount Lemmon Survey || HIL3:2 || align=right | 5.7 km || 
|-id=203 bgcolor=#fefefe
| 306203 ||  || — || July 14, 2007 || Dauban || F. Kugel || — || align=right | 1.0 km || 
|-id=204 bgcolor=#d6d6d6
| 306204 ||  || — || July 12, 2005 || Mount Lemmon || Mount Lemmon Survey || — || align=right | 3.7 km || 
|-id=205 bgcolor=#fefefe
| 306205 ||  || — || October 23, 1997 || Kitt Peak || Spacewatch || — || align=right data-sort-value="0.75" | 750 m || 
|-id=206 bgcolor=#E9E9E9
| 306206 ||  || — || October 3, 2002 || Socorro || LINEAR || — || align=right | 2.0 km || 
|-id=207 bgcolor=#E9E9E9
| 306207 ||  || — || September 4, 2002 || Anderson Mesa || LONEOS || — || align=right | 2.4 km || 
|-id=208 bgcolor=#fefefe
| 306208 ||  || — || August 23, 2004 || Kitt Peak || Spacewatch || — || align=right data-sort-value="0.70" | 700 m || 
|-id=209 bgcolor=#d6d6d6
| 306209 ||  || — || March 26, 2003 || Wrightwood || J. W. Young || — || align=right | 3.4 km || 
|-id=210 bgcolor=#E9E9E9
| 306210 ||  || — || May 16, 1998 || Kitt Peak || Spacewatch || — || align=right | 1.1 km || 
|-id=211 bgcolor=#E9E9E9
| 306211 ||  || — || February 1, 2009 || Kitt Peak || Spacewatch || HOF || align=right | 3.1 km || 
|-id=212 bgcolor=#fefefe
| 306212 ||  || — || September 7, 2000 || Kitt Peak || Spacewatch || — || align=right data-sort-value="0.78" | 780 m || 
|-id=213 bgcolor=#fefefe
| 306213 ||  || — || October 8, 2004 || Anderson Mesa || LONEOS || V || align=right data-sort-value="0.85" | 850 m || 
|-id=214 bgcolor=#fefefe
| 306214 ||  || — || October 31, 2000 || Socorro || LINEAR || NYS || align=right | 1.2 km || 
|-id=215 bgcolor=#d6d6d6
| 306215 ||  || — || November 4, 2004 || Kitt Peak || Spacewatch || SHU3:2 || align=right | 6.2 km || 
|-id=216 bgcolor=#E9E9E9
| 306216 ||  || — || November 23, 2003 || Kitt Peak || Spacewatch || — || align=right | 1.7 km || 
|-id=217 bgcolor=#fefefe
| 306217 ||  || — || November 1, 2000 || Socorro || LINEAR || — || align=right | 1.1 km || 
|-id=218 bgcolor=#fefefe
| 306218 ||  || — || April 5, 2003 || Kitt Peak || Spacewatch || V || align=right data-sort-value="0.94" | 940 m || 
|-id=219 bgcolor=#E9E9E9
| 306219 ||  || — || January 11, 2008 || Mount Lemmon || Mount Lemmon Survey || — || align=right | 1.7 km || 
|-id=220 bgcolor=#E9E9E9
| 306220 ||  || — || May 23, 2006 || Siding Spring || SSS || EUN || align=right | 2.2 km || 
|-id=221 bgcolor=#E9E9E9
| 306221 ||  || — || August 16, 2002 || Haleakala || NEAT || CLO || align=right | 4.6 km || 
|-id=222 bgcolor=#fefefe
| 306222 ||  || — || September 8, 2001 || Socorro || LINEAR || FLO || align=right data-sort-value="0.62" | 620 m || 
|-id=223 bgcolor=#d6d6d6
| 306223 ||  || — || October 12, 1977 || Palomar || PLS || — || align=right | 3.1 km || 
|-id=224 bgcolor=#fefefe
| 306224 ||  || — || September 29, 2000 || Kitt Peak || Spacewatch || — || align=right data-sort-value="0.94" | 940 m || 
|-id=225 bgcolor=#fefefe
| 306225 ||  || — || September 13, 2004 || Kitt Peak || Spacewatch || V || align=right data-sort-value="0.63" | 630 m || 
|-id=226 bgcolor=#d6d6d6
| 306226 ||  || — || August 28, 2006 || Catalina || CSS || KOR || align=right | 1.8 km || 
|-id=227 bgcolor=#E9E9E9
| 306227 ||  || — || November 5, 2007 || Kitt Peak || Spacewatch || — || align=right | 2.4 km || 
|-id=228 bgcolor=#d6d6d6
| 306228 ||  || — || October 7, 2000 || Anderson Mesa || LONEOS || — || align=right | 4.5 km || 
|-id=229 bgcolor=#d6d6d6
| 306229 ||  || — || October 11, 1977 || Palomar || PLS || — || align=right | 4.2 km || 
|-id=230 bgcolor=#E9E9E9
| 306230 ||  || — || April 11, 1996 || Kitt Peak || Spacewatch || TIN || align=right | 2.8 km || 
|-id=231 bgcolor=#fefefe
| 306231 ||  || — || August 31, 2000 || Kitt Peak || Spacewatch || — || align=right data-sort-value="0.83" | 830 m || 
|-id=232 bgcolor=#fefefe
| 306232 ||  || — || February 17, 2010 || Kitt Peak || Spacewatch || NYS || align=right data-sort-value="0.77" | 770 m || 
|-id=233 bgcolor=#E9E9E9
| 306233 ||  || — || March 24, 2001 || Kitt Peak || Spacewatch || — || align=right | 1.8 km || 
|-id=234 bgcolor=#fefefe
| 306234 ||  || — || February 27, 2003 || Kleť || M. Tichý, M. Kočer || — || align=right data-sort-value="0.74" | 740 m || 
|-id=235 bgcolor=#d6d6d6
| 306235 ||  || — || December 16, 2007 || Mount Lemmon || Mount Lemmon Survey || — || align=right | 3.6 km || 
|-id=236 bgcolor=#E9E9E9
| 306236 ||  || — || March 12, 2005 || Kitt Peak || Spacewatch || — || align=right | 3.0 km || 
|-id=237 bgcolor=#fefefe
| 306237 ||  || — || December 11, 2004 || Campo Imperatore || CINEOS || MAS || align=right | 1.2 km || 
|-id=238 bgcolor=#d6d6d6
| 306238 ||  || — || July 10, 2005 || Siding Spring || SSS || — || align=right | 4.1 km || 
|-id=239 bgcolor=#d6d6d6
| 306239 ||  || — || September 21, 2000 || Kitt Peak || Spacewatch || — || align=right | 3.4 km || 
|-id=240 bgcolor=#d6d6d6
| 306240 ||  || — || February 9, 2005 || La Silla || A. Boattini, H. Scholl || — || align=right | 3.7 km || 
|-id=241 bgcolor=#E9E9E9
| 306241 ||  || — || April 6, 2005 || Catalina || CSS || HNS || align=right | 1.5 km || 
|-id=242 bgcolor=#E9E9E9
| 306242 ||  || — || November 15, 2007 || Mount Lemmon || Mount Lemmon Survey || — || align=right | 1.9 km || 
|-id=243 bgcolor=#d6d6d6
| 306243 ||  || — || August 10, 2005 || Siding Spring || SSS || EUP || align=right | 4.1 km || 
|-id=244 bgcolor=#fefefe
| 306244 ||  || — || October 10, 2004 || Kitt Peak || Spacewatch || V || align=right data-sort-value="0.99" | 990 m || 
|-id=245 bgcolor=#d6d6d6
| 306245 ||  || — || March 20, 1999 || Apache Point || SDSS || — || align=right | 3.3 km || 
|-id=246 bgcolor=#E9E9E9
| 306246 ||  || — || January 31, 2009 || Mount Lemmon || Mount Lemmon Survey || HOF || align=right | 3.1 km || 
|-id=247 bgcolor=#fefefe
| 306247 ||  || — || April 25, 2003 || Kitt Peak || Spacewatch || MAS || align=right data-sort-value="0.78" | 780 m || 
|-id=248 bgcolor=#d6d6d6
| 306248 ||  || — || May 11, 2010 || Mount Lemmon || Mount Lemmon Survey || HYG || align=right | 2.5 km || 
|-id=249 bgcolor=#fefefe
| 306249 ||  || — || April 26, 2003 || Kitt Peak || Spacewatch || — || align=right data-sort-value="0.74" | 740 m || 
|-id=250 bgcolor=#d6d6d6
| 306250 ||  || — || August 31, 2000 || Kitt Peak || Spacewatch || — || align=right | 2.9 km || 
|-id=251 bgcolor=#E9E9E9
| 306251 ||  || — || January 13, 2005 || Kitt Peak || Spacewatch || — || align=right | 4.2 km || 
|-id=252 bgcolor=#fefefe
| 306252 ||  || — || February 25, 2006 || Mount Lemmon || Mount Lemmon Survey || — || align=right | 1.5 km || 
|-id=253 bgcolor=#E9E9E9
| 306253 ||  || — || February 9, 2005 || Kitt Peak || Spacewatch || — || align=right | 1.8 km || 
|-id=254 bgcolor=#E9E9E9
| 306254 ||  || — || March 4, 2001 || Kitt Peak || Spacewatch || TIN || align=right | 1.2 km || 
|-id=255 bgcolor=#E9E9E9
| 306255 ||  || — || December 30, 2008 || Kitt Peak || Spacewatch || MRX || align=right | 2.6 km || 
|-id=256 bgcolor=#fefefe
| 306256 ||  || — || March 24, 2003 || Kitt Peak || Spacewatch || NYS || align=right data-sort-value="0.58" | 580 m || 
|-id=257 bgcolor=#E9E9E9
| 306257 ||  || — || May 25, 2006 || Mauna Kea || P. A. Wiegert || — || align=right | 1.1 km || 
|-id=258 bgcolor=#d6d6d6
| 306258 ||  || — || March 24, 2003 || Kitt Peak || Spacewatch || VER || align=right | 3.7 km || 
|-id=259 bgcolor=#E9E9E9
| 306259 ||  || — || April 12, 1996 || Kitt Peak || Spacewatch || — || align=right | 2.5 km || 
|-id=260 bgcolor=#d6d6d6
| 306260 ||  || — || August 31, 2000 || Socorro || LINEAR || — || align=right | 3.6 km || 
|-id=261 bgcolor=#d6d6d6
| 306261 ||  || — || February 3, 2009 || Kitt Peak || Spacewatch || — || align=right | 2.7 km || 
|-id=262 bgcolor=#d6d6d6
| 306262 ||  || — || September 21, 2001 || Kitt Peak || Spacewatch || — || align=right | 2.7 km || 
|-id=263 bgcolor=#d6d6d6
| 306263 ||  || — || January 16, 2008 || Kitt Peak || Spacewatch || — || align=right | 3.6 km || 
|-id=264 bgcolor=#E9E9E9
| 306264 ||  || — || July 19, 2002 || Palomar || NEAT || — || align=right | 1.9 km || 
|-id=265 bgcolor=#d6d6d6
| 306265 ||  || — || March 31, 2004 || Kitt Peak || Spacewatch || — || align=right | 2.9 km || 
|-id=266 bgcolor=#fefefe
| 306266 ||  || — || March 25, 2006 || Mount Lemmon || Mount Lemmon Survey || — || align=right | 1.1 km || 
|-id=267 bgcolor=#d6d6d6
| 306267 ||  || — || September 25, 2006 || Mount Lemmon || Mount Lemmon Survey || KOR || align=right | 1.5 km || 
|-id=268 bgcolor=#d6d6d6
| 306268 ||  || — || January 25, 2009 || Kitt Peak || Spacewatch || — || align=right | 2.0 km || 
|-id=269 bgcolor=#fefefe
| 306269 ||  || — || May 10, 2003 || Kitt Peak || Spacewatch || NYS || align=right | 1.1 km || 
|-id=270 bgcolor=#E9E9E9
| 306270 ||  || — || April 16, 2005 || Kitt Peak || Spacewatch || HOF || align=right | 2.9 km || 
|-id=271 bgcolor=#E9E9E9
| 306271 ||  || — || March 12, 2005 || Kitt Peak || Spacewatch || — || align=right | 3.2 km || 
|-id=272 bgcolor=#E9E9E9
| 306272 ||  || — || September 18, 1998 || Anderson Mesa || LONEOS || — || align=right | 2.0 km || 
|-id=273 bgcolor=#d6d6d6
| 306273 ||  || — || September 28, 2006 || Kitt Peak || Spacewatch || — || align=right | 2.8 km || 
|-id=274 bgcolor=#fefefe
| 306274 ||  || — || October 24, 2000 || Socorro || LINEAR || ERI || align=right | 2.1 km || 
|-id=275 bgcolor=#d6d6d6
| 306275 ||  || — || October 21, 1995 || Kitt Peak || Spacewatch || — || align=right | 3.1 km || 
|-id=276 bgcolor=#d6d6d6
| 306276 ||  || — || March 21, 1999 || Apache Point || SDSS || — || align=right | 2.9 km || 
|-id=277 bgcolor=#d6d6d6
| 306277 ||  || — || September 21, 2000 || Anderson Mesa || LONEOS || 637 || align=right | 3.7 km || 
|-id=278 bgcolor=#d6d6d6
| 306278 ||  || — || September 24, 2000 || Anderson Mesa || LONEOS || — || align=right | 4.7 km || 
|-id=279 bgcolor=#d6d6d6
| 306279 ||  || — || August 26, 2005 || Palomar || NEAT || — || align=right | 3.2 km || 
|-id=280 bgcolor=#E9E9E9
| 306280 ||  || — || April 6, 2006 || Siding Spring || SSS || — || align=right | 2.6 km || 
|-id=281 bgcolor=#fefefe
| 306281 ||  || — || May 29, 2003 || Socorro || LINEAR || ERI || align=right | 2.2 km || 
|-id=282 bgcolor=#E9E9E9
| 306282 ||  || — || October 19, 2003 || Kitt Peak || Spacewatch || — || align=right data-sort-value="0.94" | 940 m || 
|-id=283 bgcolor=#fefefe
| 306283 ||  || — || April 16, 1994 || Kitt Peak || Spacewatch || — || align=right | 1.1 km || 
|-id=284 bgcolor=#fefefe
| 306284 ||  || — || July 15, 2007 || Siding Spring || SSS || — || align=right | 1.5 km || 
|-id=285 bgcolor=#fefefe
| 306285 ||  || — || September 18, 1993 || Kitt Peak || Spacewatch || — || align=right | 1.1 km || 
|-id=286 bgcolor=#fefefe
| 306286 ||  || — || June 16, 2007 || Kitt Peak || Spacewatch || NYS || align=right data-sort-value="0.91" | 910 m || 
|-id=287 bgcolor=#fefefe
| 306287 ||  || — || April 2, 2006 || Kitt Peak || Spacewatch || NYS || align=right data-sort-value="0.97" | 970 m || 
|-id=288 bgcolor=#FA8072
| 306288 ||  || — || August 23, 1998 || Anderson Mesa || LONEOS || — || align=right | 1.2 km || 
|-id=289 bgcolor=#E9E9E9
| 306289 ||  || — || May 22, 2001 || Kitt Peak || Spacewatch || — || align=right | 3.2 km || 
|-id=290 bgcolor=#fefefe
| 306290 ||  || — || February 25, 2006 || Kitt Peak || Spacewatch || — || align=right | 1.2 km || 
|-id=291 bgcolor=#E9E9E9
| 306291 ||  || — || September 10, 2007 || Kitt Peak || Spacewatch || — || align=right | 2.5 km || 
|-id=292 bgcolor=#fefefe
| 306292 ||  || — || March 12, 2002 || Palomar || NEAT || — || align=right | 1.3 km || 
|-id=293 bgcolor=#fefefe
| 306293 ||  || — || December 29, 2008 || Kitt Peak || Spacewatch || MAS || align=right data-sort-value="0.98" | 980 m || 
|-id=294 bgcolor=#fefefe
| 306294 ||  || — || March 12, 2010 || Mount Lemmon || Mount Lemmon Survey || NYS || align=right data-sort-value="0.83" | 830 m || 
|-id=295 bgcolor=#d6d6d6
| 306295 ||  || — || August 27, 2005 || Anderson Mesa || LONEOS || EOS || align=right | 3.7 km || 
|-id=296 bgcolor=#d6d6d6
| 306296 ||  || — || August 19, 2006 || Kitt Peak || Spacewatch || KOR || align=right | 1.4 km || 
|-id=297 bgcolor=#d6d6d6
| 306297 ||  || — || November 29, 2000 || Socorro || LINEAR || TIR || align=right | 3.8 km || 
|-id=298 bgcolor=#d6d6d6
| 306298 ||  || — || April 4, 2003 || Kitt Peak || Spacewatch || — || align=right | 5.2 km || 
|-id=299 bgcolor=#d6d6d6
| 306299 ||  || — || October 21, 1995 || Kitt Peak || Spacewatch || — || align=right | 3.2 km || 
|-id=300 bgcolor=#d6d6d6
| 306300 ||  || — || September 24, 2000 || Socorro || LINEAR || — || align=right | 4.8 km || 
|}

306301–306400 

|-bgcolor=#E9E9E9
| 306301 ||  || — || February 22, 2004 || Kitt Peak || Spacewatch || HOF || align=right | 3.9 km || 
|-id=302 bgcolor=#E9E9E9
| 306302 ||  || — || April 11, 2005 || Mount Lemmon || Mount Lemmon Survey || WIT || align=right data-sort-value="0.95" | 950 m || 
|-id=303 bgcolor=#fefefe
| 306303 ||  || — || November 19, 2000 || Kitt Peak || Spacewatch || — || align=right | 1.3 km || 
|-id=304 bgcolor=#E9E9E9
| 306304 ||  || — || April 2, 2005 || Mount Lemmon || Mount Lemmon Survey || — || align=right | 1.9 km || 
|-id=305 bgcolor=#E9E9E9
| 306305 ||  || — || October 5, 2002 || Palomar || NEAT || ADE || align=right | 2.7 km || 
|-id=306 bgcolor=#d6d6d6
| 306306 ||  || — || July 11, 2005 || Catalina || CSS || — || align=right | 3.9 km || 
|-id=307 bgcolor=#E9E9E9
| 306307 ||  || — || January 19, 2004 || Kitt Peak || Spacewatch || — || align=right | 2.6 km || 
|-id=308 bgcolor=#fefefe
| 306308 ||  || — || February 24, 2006 || Kitt Peak || Spacewatch || — || align=right data-sort-value="0.89" | 890 m || 
|-id=309 bgcolor=#d6d6d6
| 306309 ||  || — || September 23, 2006 || San Marcello || Pistoia Mountains Obs. || — || align=right | 3.0 km || 
|-id=310 bgcolor=#d6d6d6
| 306310 ||  || — || September 26, 2000 || Anderson Mesa || LONEOS || — || align=right | 3.7 km || 
|-id=311 bgcolor=#d6d6d6
| 306311 ||  || — || September 30, 2006 || Mount Lemmon || Mount Lemmon Survey || — || align=right | 3.7 km || 
|-id=312 bgcolor=#d6d6d6
| 306312 ||  || — || August 30, 2005 || Kitt Peak || Spacewatch || — || align=right | 3.8 km || 
|-id=313 bgcolor=#fefefe
| 306313 ||  || — || October 7, 1996 || Prescott || P. G. Comba || MAS || align=right data-sort-value="0.86" | 860 m || 
|-id=314 bgcolor=#E9E9E9
| 306314 ||  || — || May 7, 2005 || Kitt Peak || Spacewatch || AEO || align=right | 1.5 km || 
|-id=315 bgcolor=#d6d6d6
| 306315 ||  || — || August 26, 2005 || Palomar || NEAT || — || align=right | 2.9 km || 
|-id=316 bgcolor=#fefefe
| 306316 ||  || — || February 17, 2010 || Kitt Peak || Spacewatch || — || align=right data-sort-value="0.87" | 870 m || 
|-id=317 bgcolor=#d6d6d6
| 306317 ||  || — || October 17, 1995 || Kitt Peak || Spacewatch || — || align=right | 3.7 km || 
|-id=318 bgcolor=#E9E9E9
| 306318 ||  || — || August 11, 1997 || Kitt Peak || Spacewatch || — || align=right | 2.4 km || 
|-id=319 bgcolor=#E9E9E9
| 306319 ||  || — || October 4, 2002 || Palomar || NEAT || — || align=right | 1.9 km || 
|-id=320 bgcolor=#fefefe
| 306320 ||  || — || February 27, 2006 || Mount Lemmon || Mount Lemmon Survey || NYS || align=right data-sort-value="0.80" | 800 m || 
|-id=321 bgcolor=#d6d6d6
| 306321 ||  || — || October 22, 2006 || Catalina || CSS || EMA || align=right | 3.8 km || 
|-id=322 bgcolor=#d6d6d6
| 306322 ||  || — || February 13, 2008 || Kitt Peak || Spacewatch || — || align=right | 3.0 km || 
|-id=323 bgcolor=#E9E9E9
| 306323 ||  || — || March 8, 2005 || Mount Lemmon || Mount Lemmon Survey || — || align=right | 2.0 km || 
|-id=324 bgcolor=#d6d6d6
| 306324 ||  || — || March 18, 2004 || Kitt Peak || Spacewatch || KOR || align=right | 1.5 km || 
|-id=325 bgcolor=#d6d6d6
| 306325 ||  || — || August 14, 2001 || Palomar || NEAT || — || align=right | 3.7 km || 
|-id=326 bgcolor=#d6d6d6
| 306326 ||  || — || January 18, 2008 || Mount Lemmon || Mount Lemmon Survey || EOS || align=right | 2.7 km || 
|-id=327 bgcolor=#fefefe
| 306327 ||  || — || October 5, 2004 || Kitt Peak || Spacewatch || — || align=right data-sort-value="0.68" | 680 m || 
|-id=328 bgcolor=#fefefe
| 306328 ||  || — || January 15, 2005 || Pla D'Arguines || Pla D'Arguines Obs. || MAS || align=right | 1.1 km || 
|-id=329 bgcolor=#fefefe
| 306329 ||  || — || April 29, 2003 || Haleakala || NEAT || — || align=right | 1.1 km || 
|-id=330 bgcolor=#fefefe
| 306330 ||  || — || October 24, 2000 || Socorro || LINEAR || NYS || align=right data-sort-value="0.93" | 930 m || 
|-id=331 bgcolor=#d6d6d6
| 306331 ||  || — || September 20, 2001 || Socorro || LINEAR || — || align=right | 3.2 km || 
|-id=332 bgcolor=#fefefe
| 306332 ||  || — || August 10, 2007 || Kitt Peak || Spacewatch || NYS || align=right data-sort-value="0.58" | 580 m || 
|-id=333 bgcolor=#fefefe
| 306333 ||  || — || February 18, 2010 || Mount Lemmon || Mount Lemmon Survey || — || align=right | 1.1 km || 
|-id=334 bgcolor=#fefefe
| 306334 ||  || — || October 1, 2000 || Socorro || LINEAR || — || align=right data-sort-value="0.98" | 980 m || 
|-id=335 bgcolor=#fefefe
| 306335 ||  || — || January 18, 2005 || Kitt Peak || Spacewatch || NYS || align=right data-sort-value="0.61" | 610 m || 
|-id=336 bgcolor=#fefefe
| 306336 ||  || — || August 25, 2001 || Socorro || LINEAR || — || align=right data-sort-value="0.69" | 690 m || 
|-id=337 bgcolor=#d6d6d6
| 306337 ||  || — || October 1, 2000 || Socorro || LINEAR || THM || align=right | 2.7 km || 
|-id=338 bgcolor=#d6d6d6
| 306338 ||  || — || September 30, 2000 || Kitt Peak || Spacewatch || THM || align=right | 2.5 km || 
|-id=339 bgcolor=#fefefe
| 306339 ||  || — || January 5, 2003 || Kitt Peak || DLS || — || align=right data-sort-value="0.83" | 830 m || 
|-id=340 bgcolor=#fefefe
| 306340 ||  || — || September 13, 2007 || Mount Lemmon || Mount Lemmon Survey || MAS || align=right data-sort-value="0.87" | 870 m || 
|-id=341 bgcolor=#fefefe
| 306341 ||  || — || November 11, 2004 || Kitt Peak || Spacewatch || — || align=right data-sort-value="0.83" | 830 m || 
|-id=342 bgcolor=#E9E9E9
| 306342 ||  || — || October 1, 2003 || Kitt Peak || Spacewatch || — || align=right | 1.2 km || 
|-id=343 bgcolor=#fefefe
| 306343 ||  || — || November 1, 2000 || Socorro || LINEAR || MAS || align=right | 1.0 km || 
|-id=344 bgcolor=#E9E9E9
| 306344 ||  || — || May 8, 2005 || Kitt Peak || Spacewatch || HEN || align=right | 1.1 km || 
|-id=345 bgcolor=#d6d6d6
| 306345 ||  || — || September 18, 2001 || Kitt Peak || Spacewatch || KOR || align=right | 1.6 km || 
|-id=346 bgcolor=#fefefe
| 306346 ||  || — || August 7, 2004 || Palomar || NEAT || FLO || align=right data-sort-value="0.65" | 650 m || 
|-id=347 bgcolor=#d6d6d6
| 306347 ||  || — || August 26, 2005 || Palomar || NEAT || — || align=right | 3.2 km || 
|-id=348 bgcolor=#d6d6d6
| 306348 ||  || — || September 24, 2000 || Socorro || LINEAR || EOS || align=right | 2.5 km || 
|-id=349 bgcolor=#fefefe
| 306349 ||  || — || September 21, 2000 || Kitt Peak || Spacewatch || NYS || align=right data-sort-value="0.65" | 650 m || 
|-id=350 bgcolor=#E9E9E9
| 306350 ||  || — || August 12, 2006 || Palomar || NEAT || HEN || align=right | 1.5 km || 
|-id=351 bgcolor=#fefefe
| 306351 ||  || — || April 8, 2002 || Kitt Peak || Spacewatch || NYS || align=right data-sort-value="0.66" | 660 m || 
|-id=352 bgcolor=#fefefe
| 306352 ||  || — || February 3, 2009 || Kitt Peak || Spacewatch || NYS || align=right data-sort-value="0.76" | 760 m || 
|-id=353 bgcolor=#E9E9E9
| 306353 ||  || — || October 4, 2002 || Palomar || NEAT || NEM || align=right | 2.2 km || 
|-id=354 bgcolor=#d6d6d6
| 306354 ||  || — || October 1, 2000 || Socorro || LINEAR || — || align=right | 3.0 km || 
|-id=355 bgcolor=#d6d6d6
| 306355 ||  || — || November 15, 2006 || Catalina || CSS || — || align=right | 4.6 km || 
|-id=356 bgcolor=#fefefe
| 306356 ||  || — || February 22, 2002 || Palomar || NEAT || NYS || align=right data-sort-value="0.70" | 700 m || 
|-id=357 bgcolor=#E9E9E9
| 306357 ||  || — || August 6, 2002 || Palomar || NEAT || — || align=right | 1.9 km || 
|-id=358 bgcolor=#fefefe
| 306358 ||  || — || October 17, 2001 || Socorro || LINEAR || — || align=right data-sort-value="0.68" | 680 m || 
|-id=359 bgcolor=#d6d6d6
| 306359 ||  || — || January 18, 2008 || Mount Lemmon || Mount Lemmon Survey || — || align=right | 4.0 km || 
|-id=360 bgcolor=#E9E9E9
| 306360 ||  || — || September 10, 2007 || Mount Lemmon || Mount Lemmon Survey || KRM || align=right | 2.6 km || 
|-id=361 bgcolor=#d6d6d6
| 306361 ||  || — || September 24, 2000 || Socorro || LINEAR || URS || align=right | 3.3 km || 
|-id=362 bgcolor=#E9E9E9
| 306362 ||  || — || August 7, 2002 || Palomar || NEAT || — || align=right | 1.8 km || 
|-id=363 bgcolor=#fefefe
| 306363 ||  || — || December 2, 2004 || Kitt Peak || Spacewatch || — || align=right | 1.1 km || 
|-id=364 bgcolor=#d6d6d6
| 306364 || 2011 TD || — || February 13, 2004 || Kitt Peak || Spacewatch || — || align=right | 3.5 km || 
|-id=365 bgcolor=#fefefe
| 306365 || 2233 P-L || — || September 24, 1960 || Palomar || PLS || — || align=right | 1.0 km || 
|-id=366 bgcolor=#fefefe
| 306366 || 2842 P-L || — || September 24, 1960 || Palomar || PLS || NYS || align=right data-sort-value="0.74" | 740 m || 
|-id=367 bgcolor=#FFC2E0
| 306367 Nut || 5025 P-L ||  || October 22, 1960 || Palomar || PLS || APO +1km || align=right | 2.6 km || 
|-id=368 bgcolor=#E9E9E9
| 306368 || 6259 P-L || — || September 24, 1960 || Palomar || PLS || — || align=right | 1.8 km || 
|-id=369 bgcolor=#fefefe
| 306369 || 6883 P-L || — || September 24, 1960 || Palomar || PLS || — || align=right data-sort-value="0.94" | 940 m || 
|-id=370 bgcolor=#E9E9E9
| 306370 || 3154 T-1 || — || March 26, 1971 || Palomar || PLS || — || align=right | 2.8 km || 
|-id=371 bgcolor=#fefefe
| 306371 || 4282 T-2 || — || September 29, 1973 || Palomar || PLS || — || align=right | 1.2 km || 
|-id=372 bgcolor=#d6d6d6
| 306372 || 4285 T-2 || — || September 29, 1973 || Palomar || PLS || — || align=right | 4.8 km || 
|-id=373 bgcolor=#d6d6d6
| 306373 || 1125 T-3 || — || October 17, 1977 || Palomar || PLS || — || align=right | 3.1 km || 
|-id=374 bgcolor=#fefefe
| 306374 || 3362 T-3 || — || October 16, 1977 || Palomar || PLS || NYS || align=right data-sort-value="0.84" | 840 m || 
|-id=375 bgcolor=#FA8072
| 306375 ||  || — || September 13, 1980 || Palomar || C. T. Kowal || — || align=right | 2.0 km || 
|-id=376 bgcolor=#FA8072
| 306376 || 1983 TA || — || October 1, 1983 || Siding Spring || K. S. Russell || — || align=right | 1.9 km || 
|-id=377 bgcolor=#E9E9E9
| 306377 ||  || — || November 18, 1990 || La Silla || E. W. Elst || — || align=right | 1.2 km || 
|-id=378 bgcolor=#fefefe
| 306378 ||  || — || September 2, 1992 || La Silla || E. W. Elst || NYS || align=right | 1.0 km || 
|-id=379 bgcolor=#E9E9E9
| 306379 ||  || — || January 22, 1993 || Kitt Peak || Spacewatch || — || align=right | 1.3 km || 
|-id=380 bgcolor=#E9E9E9
| 306380 || 1993 PH || — || August 13, 1993 || Kitt Peak || Spacewatch || — || align=right | 2.3 km || 
|-id=381 bgcolor=#FA8072
| 306381 ||  || — || September 14, 1993 || Palomar || E. F. Helin || — || align=right | 2.8 km || 
|-id=382 bgcolor=#fefefe
| 306382 ||  || — || September 22, 1993 || La Silla || H. Debehogne, E. W. Elst || V || align=right | 1.1 km || 
|-id=383 bgcolor=#FFC2E0
| 306383 || 1993 VD || — || November 9, 1993 || Kitt Peak || Spacewatch || ATEPHAfast || align=right data-sort-value="0.18" | 180 m || 
|-id=384 bgcolor=#fefefe
| 306384 ||  || — || January 8, 1994 || Kitt Peak || Spacewatch || NYS || align=right data-sort-value="0.71" | 710 m || 
|-id=385 bgcolor=#E9E9E9
| 306385 ||  || — || January 8, 1994 || Kitt Peak || Spacewatch || — || align=right | 1.2 km || 
|-id=386 bgcolor=#E9E9E9
| 306386 Carlofavetti || 1994 CF ||  || February 6, 1994 || Farra d'Isonzo || Farra d'Isonzo || — || align=right | 1.5 km || 
|-id=387 bgcolor=#d6d6d6
| 306387 ||  || — || April 5, 1994 || Kitt Peak || S. M. Larson, C. W. Hergenrother || KOR || align=right | 1.4 km || 
|-id=388 bgcolor=#d6d6d6
| 306388 ||  || — || May 8, 1994 || Kitt Peak || Spacewatch || — || align=right | 3.9 km || 
|-id=389 bgcolor=#d6d6d6
| 306389 ||  || — || August 10, 1994 || La Silla || E. W. Elst || — || align=right | 3.4 km || 
|-id=390 bgcolor=#E9E9E9
| 306390 ||  || — || September 28, 1994 || Kitt Peak || Spacewatch || — || align=right | 1.3 km || 
|-id=391 bgcolor=#d6d6d6
| 306391 ||  || — || November 5, 1994 || Kitt Peak || Spacewatch || 628 || align=right | 2.0 km || 
|-id=392 bgcolor=#fefefe
| 306392 ||  || — || April 24, 1995 || Kitt Peak || Spacewatch || — || align=right | 1.3 km || 
|-id=393 bgcolor=#E9E9E9
| 306393 ||  || — || June 24, 1995 || Kitt Peak || Spacewatch || — || align=right | 2.1 km || 
|-id=394 bgcolor=#d6d6d6
| 306394 ||  || — || August 22, 1995 || Kitt Peak || Spacewatch || — || align=right | 3.5 km || 
|-id=395 bgcolor=#d6d6d6
| 306395 ||  || — || September 26, 1995 || Kitt Peak || Spacewatch || Tj (2.96) || align=right | 3.1 km || 
|-id=396 bgcolor=#d6d6d6
| 306396 ||  || — || October 19, 1995 || Kitt Peak || Spacewatch || EOS || align=right | 2.2 km || 
|-id=397 bgcolor=#d6d6d6
| 306397 ||  || — || November 16, 1995 || Kitt Peak || Spacewatch || — || align=right | 2.5 km || 
|-id=398 bgcolor=#E9E9E9
| 306398 ||  || — || December 14, 1995 || Kitt Peak || Spacewatch || — || align=right | 1.4 km || 
|-id=399 bgcolor=#FA8072
| 306399 ||  || — || January 14, 1996 || Farra d'Isonzo || Farra d'Isonzo || — || align=right | 1.9 km || 
|-id=400 bgcolor=#E9E9E9
| 306400 ||  || — || January 13, 1996 || Kitt Peak || Spacewatch || — || align=right | 1.4 km || 
|}

306401–306500 

|-bgcolor=#fefefe
| 306401 ||  || — || May 9, 1996 || Kitt Peak || Spacewatch || — || align=right data-sort-value="0.81" | 810 m || 
|-id=402 bgcolor=#d6d6d6
| 306402 ||  || — || September 17, 1996 || Kitt Peak || Spacewatch || K-2 || align=right | 1.3 km || 
|-id=403 bgcolor=#fefefe
| 306403 ||  || — || October 8, 1996 || Kitt Peak || Spacewatch || NYS || align=right data-sort-value="0.72" | 720 m || 
|-id=404 bgcolor=#fefefe
| 306404 ||  || — || October 10, 1996 || Kitt Peak || Spacewatch || NYS || align=right data-sort-value="0.86" | 860 m || 
|-id=405 bgcolor=#d6d6d6
| 306405 ||  || — || November 3, 1996 || Kitt Peak || Spacewatch || — || align=right | 3.0 km || 
|-id=406 bgcolor=#d6d6d6
| 306406 ||  || — || November 11, 1996 || Kitt Peak || Spacewatch || — || align=right | 2.7 km || 
|-id=407 bgcolor=#E9E9E9
| 306407 ||  || — || December 1, 1996 || Kitt Peak || Spacewatch || — || align=right | 1.7 km || 
|-id=408 bgcolor=#fefefe
| 306408 ||  || — || December 1, 1996 || Kitt Peak || Spacewatch || V || align=right data-sort-value="0.95" | 950 m || 
|-id=409 bgcolor=#fefefe
| 306409 ||  || — || December 7, 1996 || Kitt Peak || Spacewatch || NYS || align=right data-sort-value="0.53" | 530 m || 
|-id=410 bgcolor=#fefefe
| 306410 ||  || — || December 4, 1996 || Kitt Peak || Spacewatch || ERI || align=right | 2.0 km || 
|-id=411 bgcolor=#d6d6d6
| 306411 ||  || — || March 30, 1997 || Kitt Peak || Spacewatch || — || align=right | 4.5 km || 
|-id=412 bgcolor=#fefefe
| 306412 ||  || — || April 7, 1997 || Needville || Needville Obs. || — || align=right data-sort-value="0.88" | 880 m || 
|-id=413 bgcolor=#FA8072
| 306413 ||  || — || April 6, 1997 || Socorro || LINEAR || — || align=right data-sort-value="0.99" | 990 m || 
|-id=414 bgcolor=#fefefe
| 306414 ||  || — || November 22, 1997 || Kitt Peak || Spacewatch || — || align=right data-sort-value="0.68" | 680 m || 
|-id=415 bgcolor=#FA8072
| 306415 ||  || — || December 29, 1997 || Haleakala || NEAT || — || align=right | 1.2 km || 
|-id=416 bgcolor=#FA8072
| 306416 ||  || — || April 23, 1998 || Socorro || LINEAR || — || align=right | 3.5 km || 
|-id=417 bgcolor=#d6d6d6
| 306417 ||  || — || April 17, 1998 || Kitt Peak || Spacewatch || — || align=right | 2.8 km || 
|-id=418 bgcolor=#B88A00
| 306418 ||  || — || May 27, 1998 || Socorro || LINEAR || Tj (2.85) || align=right | 3.0 km || 
|-id=419 bgcolor=#d6d6d6
| 306419 ||  || — || June 20, 1998 || Kitt Peak || Spacewatch || — || align=right | 4.6 km || 
|-id=420 bgcolor=#E9E9E9
| 306420 ||  || — || May 28, 1998 || Kitt Peak || Spacewatch || RAF || align=right | 1.0 km || 
|-id=421 bgcolor=#FA8072
| 306421 ||  || — || August 17, 1998 || Socorro || LINEAR || — || align=right data-sort-value="0.62" | 620 m || 
|-id=422 bgcolor=#E9E9E9
| 306422 ||  || — || August 17, 1998 || Socorro || LINEAR || — || align=right | 2.9 km || 
|-id=423 bgcolor=#fefefe
| 306423 ||  || — || August 22, 1998 || Xinglong || SCAP || — || align=right data-sort-value="0.92" | 920 m || 
|-id=424 bgcolor=#E9E9E9
| 306424 ||  || — || August 17, 1998 || Socorro || LINEAR || — || align=right | 3.2 km || 
|-id=425 bgcolor=#E9E9E9
| 306425 ||  || — || August 24, 1998 || Socorro || LINEAR || MAR || align=right | 1.7 km || 
|-id=426 bgcolor=#E9E9E9
| 306426 ||  || — || August 26, 1998 || La Silla || E. W. Elst || — || align=right | 1.7 km || 
|-id=427 bgcolor=#E9E9E9
| 306427 ||  || — || September 20, 1998 || Kitt Peak || Spacewatch || — || align=right | 3.1 km || 
|-id=428 bgcolor=#E9E9E9
| 306428 ||  || — || September 16, 1998 || Kitt Peak || Spacewatch || — || align=right | 1.9 km || 
|-id=429 bgcolor=#E9E9E9
| 306429 ||  || — || September 25, 1998 || Kitt Peak || Spacewatch || — || align=right | 1.5 km || 
|-id=430 bgcolor=#fefefe
| 306430 ||  || — || September 27, 1998 || Kitt Peak || Spacewatch || — || align=right | 1.0 km || 
|-id=431 bgcolor=#FFC2E0
| 306431 ||  || — || September 29, 1998 || Socorro || LINEAR || AMO +1km || align=right | 1.3 km || 
|-id=432 bgcolor=#fefefe
| 306432 ||  || — || September 21, 1998 || La Silla || E. W. Elst || — || align=right | 1.0 km || 
|-id=433 bgcolor=#E9E9E9
| 306433 ||  || — || September 26, 1998 || Socorro || LINEAR || — || align=right | 1.7 km || 
|-id=434 bgcolor=#E9E9E9
| 306434 ||  || — || September 26, 1998 || Socorro || LINEAR || — || align=right | 1.6 km || 
|-id=435 bgcolor=#fefefe
| 306435 ||  || — || September 26, 1998 || Socorro || LINEAR || — || align=right data-sort-value="0.90" | 900 m || 
|-id=436 bgcolor=#FA8072
| 306436 ||  || — || September 26, 1998 || Socorro || LINEAR || — || align=right | 1.1 km || 
|-id=437 bgcolor=#E9E9E9
| 306437 ||  || — || October 14, 1998 || Caussols || ODAS || — || align=right | 1.2 km || 
|-id=438 bgcolor=#d6d6d6
| 306438 ||  || — || October 19, 1998 || Catalina || CSS || Tj (2.98) || align=right | 3.4 km || 
|-id=439 bgcolor=#E9E9E9
| 306439 ||  || — || October 22, 1998 || Caussols || ODAS || — || align=right | 1.5 km || 
|-id=440 bgcolor=#E9E9E9
| 306440 ||  || — || October 23, 1998 || Kitt Peak || Spacewatch || — || align=right | 1.5 km || 
|-id=441 bgcolor=#FA8072
| 306441 ||  || — || October 27, 1998 || Catalina || CSS || — || align=right | 2.1 km || 
|-id=442 bgcolor=#E9E9E9
| 306442 ||  || — || November 15, 1998 || Kitt Peak || Spacewatch || MIT || align=right | 3.0 km || 
|-id=443 bgcolor=#FA8072
| 306443 ||  || — || November 16, 1998 || Haleakala || NEAT || — || align=right | 1.6 km || 
|-id=444 bgcolor=#E9E9E9
| 306444 ||  || — || November 24, 1998 || Baton Rouge || W. R. Cooney Jr., P. M. Motl || — || align=right | 1.2 km || 
|-id=445 bgcolor=#E9E9E9
| 306445 ||  || — || November 18, 1998 || Kitt Peak || Spacewatch || — || align=right | 2.2 km || 
|-id=446 bgcolor=#fefefe
| 306446 ||  || — || November 19, 1998 || Anderson Mesa || LONEOS || — || align=right | 1.00 km || 
|-id=447 bgcolor=#E9E9E9
| 306447 ||  || — || November 16, 1998 || Kitt Peak || Spacewatch || — || align=right | 1.9 km || 
|-id=448 bgcolor=#fefefe
| 306448 ||  || — || December 7, 1998 || Caussols || ODAS || — || align=right | 1.3 km || 
|-id=449 bgcolor=#E9E9E9
| 306449 ||  || — || December 8, 1998 || Kitt Peak || Spacewatch || — || align=right | 1.8 km || 
|-id=450 bgcolor=#fefefe
| 306450 ||  || — || December 14, 1998 || Socorro || LINEAR || — || align=right | 1.6 km || 
|-id=451 bgcolor=#E9E9E9
| 306451 ||  || — || January 7, 1999 || Kitt Peak || Spacewatch || PAD || align=right | 1.7 km || 
|-id=452 bgcolor=#E9E9E9
| 306452 ||  || — || January 8, 1999 || Kitt Peak || Spacewatch || — || align=right | 1.6 km || 
|-id=453 bgcolor=#FA8072
| 306453 ||  || — || January 22, 1999 || Višnjan Observatory || K. Korlević || — || align=right | 1.1 km || 
|-id=454 bgcolor=#E9E9E9
| 306454 ||  || — || January 16, 1999 || Kitt Peak || Spacewatch || — || align=right | 1.2 km || 
|-id=455 bgcolor=#fefefe
| 306455 ||  || — || January 19, 1999 || Kitt Peak || Spacewatch || — || align=right data-sort-value="0.64" | 640 m || 
|-id=456 bgcolor=#E9E9E9
| 306456 ||  || — || February 10, 1999 || Socorro || LINEAR || — || align=right | 2.0 km || 
|-id=457 bgcolor=#E9E9E9
| 306457 ||  || — || February 10, 1999 || Socorro || LINEAR || — || align=right | 2.1 km || 
|-id=458 bgcolor=#E9E9E9
| 306458 ||  || — || March 12, 1999 || Kitt Peak || Spacewatch || — || align=right | 4.2 km || 
|-id=459 bgcolor=#FA8072
| 306459 ||  || — || April 9, 1999 || Socorro || LINEAR || — || align=right | 2.5 km || 
|-id=460 bgcolor=#E9E9E9
| 306460 ||  || — || April 12, 1999 || Socorro || LINEAR || MIT || align=right | 3.3 km || 
|-id=461 bgcolor=#FA8072
| 306461 ||  || — || June 11, 1999 || Socorro || LINEAR || Tj (2.89) || align=right | 5.5 km || 
|-id=462 bgcolor=#FFC2E0
| 306462 ||  || — || September 8, 1999 || Socorro || LINEAR || AMO || align=right data-sort-value="0.48" | 480 m || 
|-id=463 bgcolor=#fefefe
| 306463 ||  || — || September 7, 1999 || Socorro || LINEAR || H || align=right | 1.0 km || 
|-id=464 bgcolor=#FA8072
| 306464 ||  || — || September 11, 1999 || Socorro || LINEAR || — || align=right | 3.8 km || 
|-id=465 bgcolor=#fefefe
| 306465 ||  || — || September 7, 1999 || Socorro || LINEAR || CHL || align=right | 3.3 km || 
|-id=466 bgcolor=#fefefe
| 306466 ||  || — || September 7, 1999 || Socorro || LINEAR || MAS || align=right | 1.2 km || 
|-id=467 bgcolor=#fefefe
| 306467 ||  || — || September 7, 1999 || Socorro || LINEAR || — || align=right | 1.2 km || 
|-id=468 bgcolor=#fefefe
| 306468 ||  || — || September 8, 1999 || Socorro || LINEAR || — || align=right | 1.5 km || 
|-id=469 bgcolor=#E9E9E9
| 306469 ||  || — || September 9, 1999 || Socorro || LINEAR || — || align=right | 3.7 km || 
|-id=470 bgcolor=#E9E9E9
| 306470 ||  || — || September 9, 1999 || Socorro || LINEAR || — || align=right | 1.1 km || 
|-id=471 bgcolor=#fefefe
| 306471 ||  || — || September 9, 1999 || Socorro || LINEAR || — || align=right data-sort-value="0.97" | 970 m || 
|-id=472 bgcolor=#d6d6d6
| 306472 ||  || — || September 8, 1999 || Socorro || LINEAR || — || align=right | 5.5 km || 
|-id=473 bgcolor=#E9E9E9
| 306473 ||  || — || September 8, 1999 || Socorro || LINEAR || MAR || align=right | 1.3 km || 
|-id=474 bgcolor=#E9E9E9
| 306474 ||  || — || September 8, 1999 || Socorro || LINEAR || JUN || align=right | 1.2 km || 
|-id=475 bgcolor=#fefefe
| 306475 ||  || — || September 7, 1999 || Socorro || LINEAR || — || align=right | 1.0 km || 
|-id=476 bgcolor=#E9E9E9
| 306476 ||  || — || September 14, 1999 || Socorro || LINEAR || — || align=right | 1.8 km || 
|-id=477 bgcolor=#FA8072
| 306477 ||  || — || September 22, 1999 || Socorro || LINEAR || — || align=right | 1.8 km || 
|-id=478 bgcolor=#FA8072
| 306478 ||  || — || September 24, 1999 || Socorro || LINEAR || — || align=right | 4.4 km || 
|-id=479 bgcolor=#FA8072
| 306479 Tyburhoe ||  ||  || September 29, 1999 || Catalina || CSS || — || align=right | 1.4 km || 
|-id=480 bgcolor=#d6d6d6
| 306480 ||  || — || October 5, 1999 || Ondřejov || P. Kušnirák || EOS || align=right | 2.7 km || 
|-id=481 bgcolor=#fefefe
| 306481 ||  || — || October 4, 1999 || Socorro || LINEAR || — || align=right | 1.3 km || 
|-id=482 bgcolor=#E9E9E9
| 306482 ||  || — || October 7, 1999 || Kitt Peak || Spacewatch || — || align=right | 1.0 km || 
|-id=483 bgcolor=#fefefe
| 306483 ||  || — || October 10, 1999 || Kitt Peak || Spacewatch || H || align=right data-sort-value="0.87" | 870 m || 
|-id=484 bgcolor=#E9E9E9
| 306484 ||  || — || October 6, 1999 || Socorro || LINEAR || — || align=right | 1.2 km || 
|-id=485 bgcolor=#E9E9E9
| 306485 ||  || — || October 7, 1999 || Socorro || LINEAR || — || align=right | 1.4 km || 
|-id=486 bgcolor=#E9E9E9
| 306486 ||  || — || October 9, 1999 || Socorro || LINEAR || MIT || align=right | 3.6 km || 
|-id=487 bgcolor=#fefefe
| 306487 ||  || — || October 10, 1999 || Socorro || LINEAR || NYS || align=right | 1.2 km || 
|-id=488 bgcolor=#E9E9E9
| 306488 ||  || — || October 12, 1999 || Socorro || LINEAR || — || align=right | 1.7 km || 
|-id=489 bgcolor=#E9E9E9
| 306489 ||  || — || October 12, 1999 || Socorro || LINEAR || — || align=right | 1.7 km || 
|-id=490 bgcolor=#FA8072
| 306490 ||  || — || October 5, 1999 || Catalina || CSS || — || align=right | 1.3 km || 
|-id=491 bgcolor=#E9E9E9
| 306491 ||  || — || October 3, 1999 || Kitt Peak || Spacewatch || AER || align=right | 1.4 km || 
|-id=492 bgcolor=#d6d6d6
| 306492 ||  || — || October 7, 1999 || Catalina || CSS || ALA || align=right | 6.0 km || 
|-id=493 bgcolor=#fefefe
| 306493 ||  || — || October 7, 1999 || Socorro || LINEAR || — || align=right | 1.0 km || 
|-id=494 bgcolor=#E9E9E9
| 306494 ||  || — || October 10, 1999 || Socorro || LINEAR || — || align=right | 1.0 km || 
|-id=495 bgcolor=#d6d6d6
| 306495 ||  || — || October 3, 1999 || Kitt Peak || Spacewatch || — || align=right | 2.8 km || 
|-id=496 bgcolor=#fefefe
| 306496 ||  || — || October 31, 1999 || Kitt Peak || Spacewatch || — || align=right | 1.3 km || 
|-id=497 bgcolor=#d6d6d6
| 306497 ||  || — || October 30, 1999 || Catalina || CSS || Tj (2.98) || align=right | 6.2 km || 
|-id=498 bgcolor=#fefefe
| 306498 ||  || — || October 30, 1999 || Kitt Peak || Spacewatch || — || align=right data-sort-value="0.94" | 940 m || 
|-id=499 bgcolor=#E9E9E9
| 306499 ||  || — || October 31, 1999 || Kitt Peak || Spacewatch || — || align=right data-sort-value="0.90" | 900 m || 
|-id=500 bgcolor=#E9E9E9
| 306500 ||  || — || October 31, 1999 || Kitt Peak || Spacewatch || — || align=right data-sort-value="0.98" | 980 m || 
|}

306501–306600 

|-bgcolor=#E9E9E9
| 306501 ||  || — || November 3, 1999 || Baton Rouge || W. R. Cooney Jr., P. M. Motl || — || align=right | 1.2 km || 
|-id=502 bgcolor=#fefefe
| 306502 ||  || — || November 3, 1999 || Socorro || LINEAR || — || align=right | 1.4 km || 
|-id=503 bgcolor=#fefefe
| 306503 ||  || — || November 4, 1999 || Socorro || LINEAR || — || align=right | 1.2 km || 
|-id=504 bgcolor=#E9E9E9
| 306504 ||  || — || November 3, 1999 || Socorro || LINEAR || EUN || align=right | 1.8 km || 
|-id=505 bgcolor=#E9E9E9
| 306505 ||  || — || November 4, 1999 || Socorro || LINEAR || MAR || align=right | 1.2 km || 
|-id=506 bgcolor=#E9E9E9
| 306506 ||  || — || November 9, 1999 || Socorro || LINEAR || — || align=right data-sort-value="0.75" | 750 m || 
|-id=507 bgcolor=#E9E9E9
| 306507 ||  || — || November 9, 1999 || Socorro || LINEAR || — || align=right data-sort-value="0.95" | 950 m || 
|-id=508 bgcolor=#E9E9E9
| 306508 ||  || — || November 9, 1999 || Socorro || LINEAR || — || align=right data-sort-value="0.75" | 750 m || 
|-id=509 bgcolor=#E9E9E9
| 306509 ||  || — || November 5, 1999 || Kitt Peak || Spacewatch || — || align=right data-sort-value="0.98" | 980 m || 
|-id=510 bgcolor=#d6d6d6
| 306510 ||  || — || November 3, 1999 || Kitt Peak || Spacewatch || — || align=right | 3.4 km || 
|-id=511 bgcolor=#E9E9E9
| 306511 ||  || — || November 10, 1999 || Kitt Peak || Spacewatch || — || align=right | 1.1 km || 
|-id=512 bgcolor=#E9E9E9
| 306512 ||  || — || November 14, 1999 || Socorro || LINEAR || — || align=right | 1.4 km || 
|-id=513 bgcolor=#E9E9E9
| 306513 ||  || — || November 13, 1999 || Catalina || CSS || — || align=right | 1.1 km || 
|-id=514 bgcolor=#FA8072
| 306514 ||  || — || November 6, 1999 || Socorro || LINEAR || Tj (2.91) || align=right | 3.5 km || 
|-id=515 bgcolor=#E9E9E9
| 306515 ||  || — || November 15, 1999 || Socorro || LINEAR || — || align=right | 3.0 km || 
|-id=516 bgcolor=#fefefe
| 306516 ||  || — || November 12, 1999 || Socorro || LINEAR || — || align=right data-sort-value="0.98" | 980 m || 
|-id=517 bgcolor=#FA8072
| 306517 ||  || — || November 17, 1999 || Catalina || CSS || — || align=right | 4.7 km || 
|-id=518 bgcolor=#E9E9E9
| 306518 ||  || — || November 28, 1999 || Višnjan || K. Korlević || — || align=right | 1.0 km || 
|-id=519 bgcolor=#d6d6d6
| 306519 ||  || — || November 30, 1999 || Kitt Peak || Spacewatch || — || align=right | 4.2 km || 
|-id=520 bgcolor=#fefefe
| 306520 ||  || — || November 16, 1999 || Kitt Peak || Spacewatch || MAS || align=right data-sort-value="0.85" | 850 m || 
|-id=521 bgcolor=#d6d6d6
| 306521 ||  || — || November 28, 1999 || Kitt Peak || Spacewatch || — || align=right | 3.7 km || 
|-id=522 bgcolor=#FA8072
| 306522 ||  || — || December 6, 1999 || Socorro || LINEAR || — || align=right | 2.1 km || 
|-id=523 bgcolor=#FFC2E0
| 306523 ||  || — || December 7, 1999 || Socorro || LINEAR || AMO +1km || align=right data-sort-value="0.84" | 840 m || 
|-id=524 bgcolor=#E9E9E9
| 306524 ||  || — || December 7, 1999 || Socorro || LINEAR || — || align=right data-sort-value="0.89" | 890 m || 
|-id=525 bgcolor=#E9E9E9
| 306525 ||  || — || December 7, 1999 || Socorro || LINEAR || — || align=right | 1.8 km || 
|-id=526 bgcolor=#fefefe
| 306526 ||  || — || December 5, 1999 || Catalina || CSS || — || align=right | 1.5 km || 
|-id=527 bgcolor=#E9E9E9
| 306527 ||  || — || December 7, 1999 || Catalina || CSS || — || align=right | 2.2 km || 
|-id=528 bgcolor=#E9E9E9
| 306528 ||  || — || December 7, 1999 || Catalina || CSS || — || align=right | 2.0 km || 
|-id=529 bgcolor=#E9E9E9
| 306529 ||  || — || December 12, 1999 || Socorro || LINEAR || — || align=right | 1.5 km || 
|-id=530 bgcolor=#E9E9E9
| 306530 ||  || — || December 12, 1999 || Socorro || LINEAR || EUN || align=right | 2.8 km || 
|-id=531 bgcolor=#E9E9E9
| 306531 ||  || — || December 12, 1999 || Socorro || LINEAR || — || align=right | 1.7 km || 
|-id=532 bgcolor=#E9E9E9
| 306532 ||  || — || December 12, 1999 || Socorro || LINEAR || — || align=right | 2.1 km || 
|-id=533 bgcolor=#E9E9E9
| 306533 ||  || — || December 12, 1999 || Socorro || LINEAR || — || align=right | 1.7 km || 
|-id=534 bgcolor=#E9E9E9
| 306534 ||  || — || December 12, 1999 || Socorro || LINEAR || — || align=right | 2.8 km || 
|-id=535 bgcolor=#fefefe
| 306535 ||  || — || December 13, 1999 || Socorro || LINEAR || — || align=right | 1.7 km || 
|-id=536 bgcolor=#E9E9E9
| 306536 ||  || — || December 15, 1999 || Socorro || LINEAR || — || align=right | 1.8 km || 
|-id=537 bgcolor=#E9E9E9
| 306537 ||  || — || December 7, 1999 || Kitt Peak || Spacewatch || — || align=right | 1.1 km || 
|-id=538 bgcolor=#E9E9E9
| 306538 ||  || — || December 5, 1999 || Anderson Mesa || LONEOS || — || align=right | 2.2 km || 
|-id=539 bgcolor=#fefefe
| 306539 ||  || — || December 19, 1999 || Socorro || LINEAR || PHO || align=right | 1.3 km || 
|-id=540 bgcolor=#FA8072
| 306540 ||  || — || December 30, 1999 || Socorro || LINEAR || — || align=right | 4.7 km || 
|-id=541 bgcolor=#E9E9E9
| 306541 ||  || — || December 27, 1999 || Kitt Peak || Spacewatch || — || align=right | 1.8 km || 
|-id=542 bgcolor=#E9E9E9
| 306542 ||  || — || December 27, 1999 || Kitt Peak || Spacewatch || — || align=right | 1.6 km || 
|-id=543 bgcolor=#fefefe
| 306543 ||  || — || December 31, 1999 || Olathe || Olathe || — || align=right | 1.1 km || 
|-id=544 bgcolor=#E9E9E9
| 306544 ||  || — || December 27, 1999 || Kitt Peak || Spacewatch || IAN || align=right | 1.5 km || 
|-id=545 bgcolor=#E9E9E9
| 306545 ||  || — || December 18, 1999 || Kitt Peak || Spacewatch || — || align=right | 1.2 km || 
|-id=546 bgcolor=#E9E9E9
| 306546 ||  || — || January 4, 2000 || Višnjan || K. Korlević || — || align=right | 1.9 km || 
|-id=547 bgcolor=#d6d6d6
| 306547 ||  || — || January 2, 2000 || Socorro || LINEAR || — || align=right | 3.2 km || 
|-id=548 bgcolor=#E9E9E9
| 306548 ||  || — || January 3, 2000 || Socorro || LINEAR || — || align=right | 1.6 km || 
|-id=549 bgcolor=#E9E9E9
| 306549 ||  || — || January 4, 2000 || Socorro || LINEAR || — || align=right | 1.4 km || 
|-id=550 bgcolor=#E9E9E9
| 306550 ||  || — || January 5, 2000 || Socorro || LINEAR || — || align=right | 1.3 km || 
|-id=551 bgcolor=#E9E9E9
| 306551 ||  || — || January 4, 2000 || Socorro || LINEAR || — || align=right | 1.3 km || 
|-id=552 bgcolor=#E9E9E9
| 306552 ||  || — || January 2, 2000 || Socorro || LINEAR || — || align=right | 1.6 km || 
|-id=553 bgcolor=#E9E9E9
| 306553 ||  || — || January 3, 2000 || Socorro || LINEAR || — || align=right | 2.0 km || 
|-id=554 bgcolor=#d6d6d6
| 306554 ||  || — || January 8, 2000 || Socorro || LINEAR || Tj (2.99) || align=right | 5.9 km || 
|-id=555 bgcolor=#E9E9E9
| 306555 ||  || — || January 8, 2000 || Kitt Peak || Spacewatch || — || align=right | 1.3 km || 
|-id=556 bgcolor=#E9E9E9
| 306556 ||  || — || January 12, 2000 || Kitt Peak || Spacewatch || — || align=right data-sort-value="0.92" | 920 m || 
|-id=557 bgcolor=#E9E9E9
| 306557 ||  || — || January 29, 2000 || Kitt Peak || Spacewatch || EUN || align=right | 2.3 km || 
|-id=558 bgcolor=#E9E9E9
| 306558 ||  || — || January 30, 2000 || Socorro || LINEAR || — || align=right | 1.3 km || 
|-id=559 bgcolor=#E9E9E9
| 306559 ||  || — || January 28, 2000 || Kitt Peak || Spacewatch || — || align=right data-sort-value="0.98" | 980 m || 
|-id=560 bgcolor=#E9E9E9
| 306560 ||  || — || February 2, 2000 || Socorro || LINEAR || — || align=right | 1.2 km || 
|-id=561 bgcolor=#E9E9E9
| 306561 ||  || — || February 1, 2000 || Kitt Peak || Spacewatch || — || align=right | 1.9 km || 
|-id=562 bgcolor=#E9E9E9
| 306562 ||  || — || February 8, 2000 || Kitt Peak || Spacewatch || — || align=right | 1.1 km || 
|-id=563 bgcolor=#E9E9E9
| 306563 ||  || — || February 4, 2000 || Socorro || LINEAR || — || align=right | 1.3 km || 
|-id=564 bgcolor=#E9E9E9
| 306564 ||  || — || February 3, 2000 || Socorro || LINEAR || — || align=right | 1.3 km || 
|-id=565 bgcolor=#E9E9E9
| 306565 ||  || — || February 3, 2000 || Socorro || LINEAR || — || align=right | 1.4 km || 
|-id=566 bgcolor=#E9E9E9
| 306566 ||  || — || February 1, 2000 || Kitt Peak || Spacewatch || — || align=right | 1.0 km || 
|-id=567 bgcolor=#E9E9E9
| 306567 ||  || — || February 3, 2000 || Socorro || LINEAR || — || align=right | 1.3 km || 
|-id=568 bgcolor=#E9E9E9
| 306568 ||  || — || February 4, 2000 || Kitt Peak || Spacewatch || — || align=right | 1.2 km || 
|-id=569 bgcolor=#E9E9E9
| 306569 ||  || — || February 4, 2000 || Kitt Peak || Spacewatch || — || align=right | 1.2 km || 
|-id=570 bgcolor=#E9E9E9
| 306570 ||  || — || February 4, 2000 || Kitt Peak || Spacewatch || — || align=right | 1.1 km || 
|-id=571 bgcolor=#E9E9E9
| 306571 ||  || — || February 27, 2000 || Kitt Peak || Spacewatch || — || align=right | 1.5 km || 
|-id=572 bgcolor=#E9E9E9
| 306572 ||  || — || February 28, 2000 || Socorro || LINEAR || — || align=right | 1.7 km || 
|-id=573 bgcolor=#E9E9E9
| 306573 ||  || — || February 29, 2000 || Socorro || LINEAR || — || align=right | 1.1 km || 
|-id=574 bgcolor=#fefefe
| 306574 ||  || — || February 29, 2000 || Socorro || LINEAR || — || align=right | 1.1 km || 
|-id=575 bgcolor=#E9E9E9
| 306575 ||  || — || February 29, 2000 || Socorro || LINEAR || — || align=right | 1.2 km || 
|-id=576 bgcolor=#E9E9E9
| 306576 ||  || — || February 25, 2000 || Kitt Peak || Spacewatch || — || align=right data-sort-value="0.98" | 980 m || 
|-id=577 bgcolor=#E9E9E9
| 306577 ||  || — || March 5, 2000 || Socorro || LINEAR || — || align=right | 2.1 km || 
|-id=578 bgcolor=#E9E9E9
| 306578 ||  || — || March 5, 2000 || Socorro || LINEAR || — || align=right | 2.1 km || 
|-id=579 bgcolor=#E9E9E9
| 306579 ||  || — || March 8, 2000 || Socorro || LINEAR || BAR || align=right | 1.5 km || 
|-id=580 bgcolor=#E9E9E9
| 306580 ||  || — || March 11, 2000 || Anderson Mesa || LONEOS || — || align=right | 2.1 km || 
|-id=581 bgcolor=#E9E9E9
| 306581 ||  || — || March 6, 2000 || Cerro Tololo || DLS || — || align=right | 2.2 km || 
|-id=582 bgcolor=#fefefe
| 306582 ||  || — || March 26, 2000 || Prescott || P. G. Comba || — || align=right data-sort-value="0.62" | 620 m || 
|-id=583 bgcolor=#E9E9E9
| 306583 ||  || — || March 25, 2000 || Kitt Peak || Spacewatch || — || align=right | 1.6 km || 
|-id=584 bgcolor=#fefefe
| 306584 ||  || — || March 29, 2000 || Socorro || LINEAR || — || align=right | 1.5 km || 
|-id=585 bgcolor=#E9E9E9
| 306585 ||  || — || March 30, 2000 || Kitt Peak || Spacewatch || — || align=right | 1.8 km || 
|-id=586 bgcolor=#E9E9E9
| 306586 ||  || — || March 29, 2000 || Socorro || LINEAR || — || align=right | 1.4 km || 
|-id=587 bgcolor=#FA8072
| 306587 ||  || — || March 29, 2000 || Socorro || LINEAR || — || align=right | 5.1 km || 
|-id=588 bgcolor=#E9E9E9
| 306588 ||  || — || March 30, 2000 || Kitt Peak || Spacewatch || — || align=right | 2.4 km || 
|-id=589 bgcolor=#E9E9E9
| 306589 ||  || — || March 30, 2000 || Socorro || LINEAR || — || align=right | 2.3 km || 
|-id=590 bgcolor=#FA8072
| 306590 ||  || — || April 5, 2000 || Socorro || LINEAR || — || align=right | 2.4 km || 
|-id=591 bgcolor=#fefefe
| 306591 ||  || — || April 5, 2000 || Socorro || LINEAR || — || align=right data-sort-value="0.79" | 790 m || 
|-id=592 bgcolor=#E9E9E9
| 306592 ||  || — || April 5, 2000 || Socorro || LINEAR || — || align=right | 1.2 km || 
|-id=593 bgcolor=#E9E9E9
| 306593 ||  || — || April 2, 2000 || Kitt Peak || Spacewatch || — || align=right | 1.6 km || 
|-id=594 bgcolor=#d6d6d6
| 306594 ||  || — || April 5, 2000 || Kitt Peak || Spacewatch || NAE || align=right | 3.6 km || 
|-id=595 bgcolor=#FFC2E0
| 306595 ||  || — || April 10, 2000 || Anderson Mesa || LONEOS || AMO || align=right data-sort-value="0.59" | 590 m || 
|-id=596 bgcolor=#d6d6d6
| 306596 ||  || — || April 7, 2000 || Anderson Mesa || LONEOS || — || align=right | 3.5 km || 
|-id=597 bgcolor=#E9E9E9
| 306597 ||  || — || April 4, 2000 || Anderson Mesa || LONEOS || MIT || align=right | 3.8 km || 
|-id=598 bgcolor=#E9E9E9
| 306598 ||  || — || April 2, 2000 || Kitt Peak || Spacewatch || EUN || align=right | 2.0 km || 
|-id=599 bgcolor=#E9E9E9
| 306599 ||  || — || April 24, 2000 || Anderson Mesa || LONEOS || — || align=right | 1.9 km || 
|-id=600 bgcolor=#FA8072
| 306600 ||  || — || April 28, 2000 || Socorro || LINEAR || — || align=right | 2.9 km || 
|}

306601–306700 

|-bgcolor=#fefefe
| 306601 ||  || — || April 27, 2000 || Socorro || LINEAR || H || align=right data-sort-value="0.94" | 940 m || 
|-id=602 bgcolor=#E9E9E9
| 306602 ||  || — || April 27, 2000 || Anderson Mesa || LONEOS || — || align=right | 1.5 km || 
|-id=603 bgcolor=#E9E9E9
| 306603 ||  || — || May 3, 2000 || Socorro || LINEAR || — || align=right | 5.2 km || 
|-id=604 bgcolor=#E9E9E9
| 306604 ||  || — || May 28, 2000 || Socorro || LINEAR || — || align=right | 1.9 km || 
|-id=605 bgcolor=#FA8072
| 306605 ||  || — || June 11, 2000 || Socorro || LINEAR || — || align=right | 4.4 km || 
|-id=606 bgcolor=#FA8072
| 306606 ||  || — || June 6, 2000 || Anderson Mesa || LONEOS || — || align=right | 5.3 km || 
|-id=607 bgcolor=#FA8072
| 306607 ||  || — || July 27, 2000 || Prescott || P. G. Comba || — || align=right | 1.1 km || 
|-id=608 bgcolor=#E9E9E9
| 306608 ||  || — || July 23, 2000 || Socorro || LINEAR || JUN || align=right | 1.5 km || 
|-id=609 bgcolor=#fefefe
| 306609 ||  || — || July 30, 2000 || Socorro || LINEAR || PHO || align=right | 1.3 km || 
|-id=610 bgcolor=#fefefe
| 306610 ||  || — || July 24, 2000 || Socorro || LINEAR || — || align=right | 1.3 km || 
|-id=611 bgcolor=#d6d6d6
| 306611 ||  || — || August 4, 2000 || Siding Spring || R. H. McNaught || EUP || align=right | 7.3 km || 
|-id=612 bgcolor=#d6d6d6
| 306612 ||  || — || August 9, 2000 || Socorro || LINEAR || EUP || align=right | 7.4 km || 
|-id=613 bgcolor=#FA8072
| 306613 ||  || — || August 22, 2000 || Socorro || LINEAR || — || align=right | 5.7 km || 
|-id=614 bgcolor=#FA8072
| 306614 ||  || — || August 24, 2000 || Socorro || LINEAR || PHO || align=right | 1.8 km || 
|-id=615 bgcolor=#d6d6d6
| 306615 ||  || — || August 24, 2000 || Socorro || LINEAR || — || align=right | 3.6 km || 
|-id=616 bgcolor=#fefefe
| 306616 ||  || — || August 24, 2000 || Socorro || LINEAR || NYS || align=right | 1.0 km || 
|-id=617 bgcolor=#E9E9E9
| 306617 ||  || — || August 24, 2000 || Socorro || LINEAR || — || align=right | 2.4 km || 
|-id=618 bgcolor=#E9E9E9
| 306618 ||  || — || August 26, 2000 || Socorro || LINEAR || BAR || align=right | 2.0 km || 
|-id=619 bgcolor=#fefefe
| 306619 ||  || — || August 26, 2000 || Socorro || LINEAR || — || align=right | 1.1 km || 
|-id=620 bgcolor=#E9E9E9
| 306620 ||  || — || August 24, 2000 || Socorro || LINEAR || — || align=right | 1.0 km || 
|-id=621 bgcolor=#fefefe
| 306621 ||  || — || August 26, 2000 || Socorro || LINEAR || NYS || align=right data-sort-value="0.91" | 910 m || 
|-id=622 bgcolor=#E9E9E9
| 306622 ||  || — || August 26, 2000 || Socorro || LINEAR || — || align=right | 1.9 km || 
|-id=623 bgcolor=#E9E9E9
| 306623 ||  || — || August 26, 2000 || Socorro || LINEAR || HNA || align=right | 3.2 km || 
|-id=624 bgcolor=#E9E9E9
| 306624 ||  || — || August 28, 2000 || Socorro || LINEAR || JUN || align=right | 2.3 km || 
|-id=625 bgcolor=#fefefe
| 306625 ||  || — || August 28, 2000 || Socorro || LINEAR || — || align=right | 2.3 km || 
|-id=626 bgcolor=#fefefe
| 306626 ||  || — || August 24, 2000 || Socorro || LINEAR || NYS || align=right data-sort-value="0.73" | 730 m || 
|-id=627 bgcolor=#fefefe
| 306627 ||  || — || August 25, 2000 || Socorro || LINEAR || V || align=right data-sort-value="0.90" | 900 m || 
|-id=628 bgcolor=#E9E9E9
| 306628 ||  || — || August 31, 2000 || Socorro || LINEAR || — || align=right | 1.2 km || 
|-id=629 bgcolor=#fefefe
| 306629 ||  || — || August 31, 2000 || Socorro || LINEAR || — || align=right | 1.2 km || 
|-id=630 bgcolor=#E9E9E9
| 306630 ||  || — || August 31, 2000 || Socorro || LINEAR || — || align=right | 3.6 km || 
|-id=631 bgcolor=#fefefe
| 306631 ||  || — || August 31, 2000 || Socorro || LINEAR || — || align=right data-sort-value="0.97" | 970 m || 
|-id=632 bgcolor=#fefefe
| 306632 ||  || — || August 31, 2000 || Socorro || LINEAR || — || align=right | 1.5 km || 
|-id=633 bgcolor=#fefefe
| 306633 ||  || — || September 10, 2000 || Anderson Mesa || LONEOS || — || align=right | 1.2 km || 
|-id=634 bgcolor=#d6d6d6
| 306634 ||  || — || September 23, 2000 || Socorro || LINEAR || — || align=right | 4.0 km || 
|-id=635 bgcolor=#fefefe
| 306635 ||  || — || September 23, 2000 || Socorro || LINEAR || — || align=right | 1.8 km || 
|-id=636 bgcolor=#fefefe
| 306636 ||  || — || September 23, 2000 || Socorro || LINEAR || — || align=right | 1.3 km || 
|-id=637 bgcolor=#fefefe
| 306637 ||  || — || September 24, 2000 || Socorro || LINEAR || H || align=right data-sort-value="0.80" | 800 m || 
|-id=638 bgcolor=#E9E9E9
| 306638 ||  || — || September 24, 2000 || Socorro || LINEAR || — || align=right | 1.3 km || 
|-id=639 bgcolor=#fefefe
| 306639 ||  || — || September 24, 2000 || Socorro || LINEAR || V || align=right data-sort-value="0.83" | 830 m || 
|-id=640 bgcolor=#E9E9E9
| 306640 ||  || — || September 24, 2000 || Socorro || LINEAR || — || align=right | 1.1 km || 
|-id=641 bgcolor=#fefefe
| 306641 ||  || — || September 24, 2000 || Socorro || LINEAR || — || align=right | 1.1 km || 
|-id=642 bgcolor=#FA8072
| 306642 ||  || — || September 25, 2000 || Anderson Mesa || LONEOS || — || align=right | 1.7 km || 
|-id=643 bgcolor=#fefefe
| 306643 ||  || — || September 23, 2000 || Socorro || LINEAR || V || align=right | 1.0 km || 
|-id=644 bgcolor=#d6d6d6
| 306644 ||  || — || September 24, 2000 || Socorro || LINEAR || 628 || align=right | 2.6 km || 
|-id=645 bgcolor=#fefefe
| 306645 ||  || — || September 24, 2000 || Socorro || LINEAR || — || align=right | 1.0 km || 
|-id=646 bgcolor=#d6d6d6
| 306646 ||  || — || September 24, 2000 || Socorro || LINEAR || — || align=right | 2.5 km || 
|-id=647 bgcolor=#fefefe
| 306647 ||  || — || September 23, 2000 || Socorro || LINEAR || — || align=right | 1.0 km || 
|-id=648 bgcolor=#d6d6d6
| 306648 ||  || — || September 23, 2000 || Socorro || LINEAR || BRA || align=right | 2.2 km || 
|-id=649 bgcolor=#fefefe
| 306649 ||  || — || September 24, 2000 || Socorro || LINEAR || — || align=right | 2.3 km || 
|-id=650 bgcolor=#E9E9E9
| 306650 ||  || — || September 23, 2000 || Socorro || LINEAR || MAR || align=right | 1.6 km || 
|-id=651 bgcolor=#E9E9E9
| 306651 ||  || — || September 23, 2000 || Socorro || LINEAR || — || align=right | 1.5 km || 
|-id=652 bgcolor=#E9E9E9
| 306652 ||  || — || September 23, 2000 || Socorro || LINEAR || MAR || align=right | 1.8 km || 
|-id=653 bgcolor=#fefefe
| 306653 ||  || — || September 23, 2000 || Socorro || LINEAR || NYS || align=right data-sort-value="0.89" | 890 m || 
|-id=654 bgcolor=#fefefe
| 306654 ||  || — || September 24, 2000 || Socorro || LINEAR || MAS || align=right data-sort-value="0.88" | 880 m || 
|-id=655 bgcolor=#E9E9E9
| 306655 ||  || — || September 24, 2000 || Socorro || LINEAR || — || align=right | 1.7 km || 
|-id=656 bgcolor=#E9E9E9
| 306656 ||  || — || September 22, 2000 || Kitt Peak || Spacewatch || EUN || align=right | 1.7 km || 
|-id=657 bgcolor=#fefefe
| 306657 ||  || — || September 22, 2000 || Haleakala || NEAT || — || align=right | 1.3 km || 
|-id=658 bgcolor=#E9E9E9
| 306658 ||  || — || September 24, 2000 || Socorro || LINEAR || INO || align=right | 1.4 km || 
|-id=659 bgcolor=#FA8072
| 306659 ||  || — || September 26, 2000 || Socorro || LINEAR || — || align=right | 1.8 km || 
|-id=660 bgcolor=#d6d6d6
| 306660 ||  || — || September 27, 2000 || Socorro || LINEAR || EOS || align=right | 2.4 km || 
|-id=661 bgcolor=#fefefe
| 306661 ||  || — || September 28, 2000 || Socorro || LINEAR || NYS || align=right data-sort-value="0.70" | 700 m || 
|-id=662 bgcolor=#E9E9E9
| 306662 ||  || — || September 26, 2000 || Socorro || LINEAR || — || align=right | 1.8 km || 
|-id=663 bgcolor=#fefefe
| 306663 ||  || — || September 24, 2000 || Socorro || LINEAR || V || align=right | 1.1 km || 
|-id=664 bgcolor=#FA8072
| 306664 ||  || — || September 26, 2000 || Socorro || LINEAR || — || align=right data-sort-value="0.84" | 840 m || 
|-id=665 bgcolor=#FA8072
| 306665 ||  || — || September 30, 2000 || Socorro || LINEAR || — || align=right | 1.2 km || 
|-id=666 bgcolor=#fefefe
| 306666 ||  || — || September 23, 2000 || Socorro || LINEAR || V || align=right data-sort-value="0.86" | 860 m || 
|-id=667 bgcolor=#E9E9E9
| 306667 ||  || — || September 28, 2000 || Socorro || LINEAR || — || align=right | 1.7 km || 
|-id=668 bgcolor=#E9E9E9
| 306668 ||  || — || September 28, 2000 || Kitt Peak || Spacewatch || — || align=right | 1.6 km || 
|-id=669 bgcolor=#d6d6d6
| 306669 ||  || — || September 26, 2000 || Haleakala || NEAT || — || align=right | 5.1 km || 
|-id=670 bgcolor=#fefefe
| 306670 ||  || — || September 26, 2000 || Anderson Mesa || LONEOS || — || align=right | 1.5 km || 
|-id=671 bgcolor=#d6d6d6
| 306671 ||  || — || October 1, 2000 || Socorro || LINEAR || EOS || align=right | 2.2 km || 
|-id=672 bgcolor=#fefefe
| 306672 ||  || — || October 1, 2000 || Socorro || LINEAR || MAS || align=right | 1.2 km || 
|-id=673 bgcolor=#d6d6d6
| 306673 ||  || — || October 1, 2000 || Socorro || LINEAR || — || align=right | 2.8 km || 
|-id=674 bgcolor=#E9E9E9
| 306674 ||  || — || October 1, 2000 || Socorro || LINEAR || — || align=right | 1.7 km || 
|-id=675 bgcolor=#d6d6d6
| 306675 ||  || — || October 4, 2000 || Socorro || LINEAR || — || align=right | 5.4 km || 
|-id=676 bgcolor=#fefefe
| 306676 ||  || — || October 1, 2000 || Socorro || LINEAR || — || align=right | 1.2 km || 
|-id=677 bgcolor=#fefefe
| 306677 ||  || — || October 2, 2000 || Socorro || LINEAR || — || align=right | 1.5 km || 
|-id=678 bgcolor=#FA8072
| 306678 ||  || — || October 19, 2000 || Socorro || LINEAR || — || align=right | 2.2 km || 
|-id=679 bgcolor=#FA8072
| 306679 ||  || — || October 18, 2000 || Socorro || LINEAR || — || align=right | 1.4 km || 
|-id=680 bgcolor=#fefefe
| 306680 ||  || — || October 18, 2000 || Socorro || LINEAR || PHO || align=right | 1.7 km || 
|-id=681 bgcolor=#fefefe
| 306681 ||  || — || October 28, 2000 || Črni Vrh || Črni Vrh || — || align=right data-sort-value="0.94" | 940 m || 
|-id=682 bgcolor=#fefefe
| 306682 ||  || — || October 25, 2000 || Socorro || LINEAR || V || align=right data-sort-value="0.99" | 990 m || 
|-id=683 bgcolor=#fefefe
| 306683 ||  || — || October 27, 2000 || Kitt Peak || Spacewatch || — || align=right data-sort-value="0.83" | 830 m || 
|-id=684 bgcolor=#E9E9E9
| 306684 ||  || — || October 24, 2000 || Socorro || LINEAR || — || align=right | 1.7 km || 
|-id=685 bgcolor=#E9E9E9
| 306685 ||  || — || October 25, 2000 || Socorro || LINEAR || — || align=right | 3.2 km || 
|-id=686 bgcolor=#fefefe
| 306686 ||  || — || October 24, 2000 || Socorro || LINEAR || NYS || align=right data-sort-value="0.84" | 840 m || 
|-id=687 bgcolor=#fefefe
| 306687 ||  || — || October 24, 2000 || Socorro || LINEAR || — || align=right data-sort-value="0.85" | 850 m || 
|-id=688 bgcolor=#d6d6d6
| 306688 ||  || — || October 25, 2000 || Socorro || LINEAR || — || align=right | 3.4 km || 
|-id=689 bgcolor=#d6d6d6
| 306689 ||  || — || October 31, 2000 || Socorro || LINEAR || — || align=right | 3.2 km || 
|-id=690 bgcolor=#E9E9E9
| 306690 ||  || — || October 24, 2000 || Socorro || LINEAR || — || align=right | 2.8 km || 
|-id=691 bgcolor=#E9E9E9
| 306691 ||  || — || October 25, 2000 || Socorro || LINEAR || — || align=right | 1.3 km || 
|-id=692 bgcolor=#E9E9E9
| 306692 ||  || — || October 25, 2000 || Socorro || LINEAR || — || align=right | 1.6 km || 
|-id=693 bgcolor=#E9E9E9
| 306693 ||  || — || October 25, 2000 || Socorro || LINEAR || — || align=right | 1.3 km || 
|-id=694 bgcolor=#E9E9E9
| 306694 ||  || — || October 29, 2000 || Socorro || LINEAR || — || align=right | 1.1 km || 
|-id=695 bgcolor=#FA8072
| 306695 ||  || — || November 1, 2000 || Socorro || LINEAR || — || align=right | 3.6 km || 
|-id=696 bgcolor=#fefefe
| 306696 ||  || — || November 1, 2000 || Socorro || LINEAR || H || align=right data-sort-value="0.62" | 620 m || 
|-id=697 bgcolor=#d6d6d6
| 306697 ||  || — || November 1, 2000 || Socorro || LINEAR || — || align=right | 3.9 km || 
|-id=698 bgcolor=#fefefe
| 306698 ||  || — || November 1, 2000 || Socorro || LINEAR || — || align=right data-sort-value="0.98" | 980 m || 
|-id=699 bgcolor=#d6d6d6
| 306699 ||  || — || November 1, 2000 || Socorro || LINEAR || — || align=right | 3.4 km || 
|-id=700 bgcolor=#d6d6d6
| 306700 ||  || — || November 1, 2000 || Socorro || LINEAR || — || align=right | 2.8 km || 
|}

306701–306800 

|-bgcolor=#E9E9E9
| 306701 ||  || — || November 1, 2000 || Socorro || LINEAR || — || align=right | 1.3 km || 
|-id=702 bgcolor=#E9E9E9
| 306702 ||  || — || November 3, 2000 || Socorro || LINEAR || — || align=right | 1.4 km || 
|-id=703 bgcolor=#FA8072
| 306703 ||  || — || November 16, 2000 || Socorro || LINEAR || PHO || align=right | 1.5 km || 
|-id=704 bgcolor=#fefefe
| 306704 ||  || — || November 19, 2000 || Socorro || LINEAR || H || align=right | 1.1 km || 
|-id=705 bgcolor=#fefefe
| 306705 ||  || — || November 16, 2000 || Socorro || LINEAR || PHO || align=right | 1.7 km || 
|-id=706 bgcolor=#fefefe
| 306706 ||  || — || November 17, 2000 || Kitt Peak || Spacewatch || NYS || align=right data-sort-value="0.77" | 770 m || 
|-id=707 bgcolor=#fefefe
| 306707 ||  || — || November 20, 2000 || Kitt Peak || Spacewatch || NYS || align=right data-sort-value="0.70" | 700 m || 
|-id=708 bgcolor=#fefefe
| 306708 ||  || — || November 20, 2000 || Socorro || LINEAR || H || align=right | 1.3 km || 
|-id=709 bgcolor=#E9E9E9
| 306709 ||  || — || November 20, 2000 || Socorro || LINEAR || — || align=right | 1.9 km || 
|-id=710 bgcolor=#fefefe
| 306710 ||  || — || November 25, 2000 || Bohyunsan || Y.-B. Jeon, B.-C. Lee || — || align=right data-sort-value="0.83" | 830 m || 
|-id=711 bgcolor=#d6d6d6
| 306711 ||  || — || November 26, 2000 || Kitt Peak || Spacewatch || — || align=right | 2.5 km || 
|-id=712 bgcolor=#d6d6d6
| 306712 ||  || — || November 21, 2000 || Socorro || LINEAR || Tj (2.96) || align=right | 4.6 km || 
|-id=713 bgcolor=#d6d6d6
| 306713 ||  || — || November 20, 2000 || Socorro || LINEAR || EUP || align=right | 5.2 km || 
|-id=714 bgcolor=#E9E9E9
| 306714 ||  || — || November 20, 2000 || Socorro || LINEAR || — || align=right | 1.8 km || 
|-id=715 bgcolor=#FA8072
| 306715 ||  || — || November 21, 2000 || Socorro || LINEAR || — || align=right | 4.5 km || 
|-id=716 bgcolor=#d6d6d6
| 306716 ||  || — || November 27, 2000 || Kitt Peak || Spacewatch || EOS || align=right | 2.6 km || 
|-id=717 bgcolor=#fefefe
| 306717 ||  || — || November 24, 2000 || Oaxaca || J. M. Roe || V || align=right data-sort-value="0.92" | 920 m || 
|-id=718 bgcolor=#E9E9E9
| 306718 ||  || — || November 19, 2000 || Socorro || LINEAR || — || align=right | 1.4 km || 
|-id=719 bgcolor=#fefefe
| 306719 ||  || — || November 20, 2000 || Socorro || LINEAR || V || align=right data-sort-value="0.99" | 990 m || 
|-id=720 bgcolor=#fefefe
| 306720 ||  || — || November 20, 2000 || Socorro || LINEAR || — || align=right | 1.3 km || 
|-id=721 bgcolor=#E9E9E9
| 306721 ||  || — || November 21, 2000 || Socorro || LINEAR || — || align=right | 2.5 km || 
|-id=722 bgcolor=#FA8072
| 306722 ||  || — || November 29, 2000 || Anderson Mesa || LONEOS || — || align=right | 1.8 km || 
|-id=723 bgcolor=#E9E9E9
| 306723 ||  || — || November 20, 2000 || Socorro || LINEAR || — || align=right | 1.5 km || 
|-id=724 bgcolor=#fefefe
| 306724 ||  || — || November 29, 2000 || Socorro || LINEAR || ERI || align=right | 2.1 km || 
|-id=725 bgcolor=#fefefe
| 306725 ||  || — || November 19, 2000 || Socorro || LINEAR || H || align=right | 1.0 km || 
|-id=726 bgcolor=#d6d6d6
| 306726 ||  || — || November 29, 2000 || Socorro || LINEAR || — || align=right | 4.0 km || 
|-id=727 bgcolor=#d6d6d6
| 306727 ||  || — || November 28, 2000 || Haleakala || NEAT || — || align=right | 4.0 km || 
|-id=728 bgcolor=#fefefe
| 306728 ||  || — || November 20, 2000 || Socorro || LINEAR || H || align=right | 1.2 km || 
|-id=729 bgcolor=#E9E9E9
| 306729 ||  || — || November 30, 2000 || Socorro || LINEAR || — || align=right | 4.3 km || 
|-id=730 bgcolor=#fefefe
| 306730 ||  || — || November 20, 2000 || Anderson Mesa || LONEOS || V || align=right data-sort-value="0.90" | 900 m || 
|-id=731 bgcolor=#fefefe
| 306731 ||  || — || November 21, 2000 || Socorro || LINEAR || H || align=right | 1.1 km || 
|-id=732 bgcolor=#d6d6d6
| 306732 ||  || — || November 24, 2000 || Anderson Mesa || LONEOS || EOS || align=right | 2.7 km || 
|-id=733 bgcolor=#E9E9E9
| 306733 ||  || — || November 24, 2000 || Anderson Mesa || LONEOS || — || align=right | 1.1 km || 
|-id=734 bgcolor=#fefefe
| 306734 ||  || — || November 26, 2000 || Socorro || LINEAR || — || align=right | 1.2 km || 
|-id=735 bgcolor=#E9E9E9
| 306735 ||  || — || November 28, 2000 || Socorro || LINEAR || — || align=right | 1.9 km || 
|-id=736 bgcolor=#d6d6d6
| 306736 ||  || — || November 27, 2000 || Socorro || LINEAR || — || align=right | 5.6 km || 
|-id=737 bgcolor=#fefefe
| 306737 ||  || — || December 1, 2000 || Socorro || LINEAR || — || align=right | 2.2 km || 
|-id=738 bgcolor=#E9E9E9
| 306738 ||  || — || December 1, 2000 || Socorro || LINEAR || — || align=right | 1.8 km || 
|-id=739 bgcolor=#d6d6d6
| 306739 ||  || — || December 1, 2000 || Socorro || LINEAR || — || align=right | 6.6 km || 
|-id=740 bgcolor=#E9E9E9
| 306740 ||  || — || December 4, 2000 || Socorro || LINEAR || — || align=right | 3.2 km || 
|-id=741 bgcolor=#E9E9E9
| 306741 ||  || — || December 4, 2000 || Socorro || LINEAR || — || align=right | 1.7 km || 
|-id=742 bgcolor=#d6d6d6
| 306742 ||  || — || December 4, 2000 || Socorro || LINEAR || — || align=right | 4.9 km || 
|-id=743 bgcolor=#d6d6d6
| 306743 ||  || — || December 5, 2000 || Socorro || LINEAR || — || align=right | 4.9 km || 
|-id=744 bgcolor=#E9E9E9
| 306744 ||  || — || December 5, 2000 || Socorro || LINEAR || EUN || align=right | 2.0 km || 
|-id=745 bgcolor=#d6d6d6
| 306745 ||  || — || December 7, 2000 || Socorro || LINEAR || — || align=right | 5.5 km || 
|-id=746 bgcolor=#E9E9E9
| 306746 ||  || — || December 4, 2000 || Socorro || LINEAR || — || align=right | 1.3 km || 
|-id=747 bgcolor=#E9E9E9
| 306747 ||  || — || December 4, 2000 || Socorro || LINEAR || ADE || align=right | 2.9 km || 
|-id=748 bgcolor=#E9E9E9
| 306748 ||  || — || December 6, 2000 || Socorro || LINEAR || — || align=right | 2.5 km || 
|-id=749 bgcolor=#FA8072
| 306749 ||  || — || December 19, 2000 || Socorro || LINEAR || — || align=right data-sort-value="0.80" | 800 m || 
|-id=750 bgcolor=#fefefe
| 306750 ||  || — || December 18, 2000 || Kitt Peak || Spacewatch || NYS || align=right data-sort-value="0.91" | 910 m || 
|-id=751 bgcolor=#fefefe
| 306751 ||  || — || December 21, 2000 || Kitt Peak || Spacewatch || — || align=right | 1.2 km || 
|-id=752 bgcolor=#E9E9E9
| 306752 ||  || — || December 22, 2000 || Ondřejov || P. Kušnirák, P. Pravec || — || align=right | 1.7 km || 
|-id=753 bgcolor=#C2FFFF
| 306753 ||  || — || December 29, 2000 || Kitt Peak || Spacewatch || L4ERY || align=right | 10 km || 
|-id=754 bgcolor=#E9E9E9
| 306754 ||  || — || December 30, 2000 || Socorro || LINEAR || — || align=right | 2.0 km || 
|-id=755 bgcolor=#fefefe
| 306755 ||  || — || December 30, 2000 || Socorro || LINEAR || — || align=right | 1.6 km || 
|-id=756 bgcolor=#fefefe
| 306756 ||  || — || December 30, 2000 || Socorro || LINEAR || ERI || align=right | 2.0 km || 
|-id=757 bgcolor=#fefefe
| 306757 ||  || — || December 30, 2000 || Socorro || LINEAR || PHO || align=right | 4.1 km || 
|-id=758 bgcolor=#E9E9E9
| 306758 ||  || — || December 30, 2000 || Socorro || LINEAR || — || align=right | 1.8 km || 
|-id=759 bgcolor=#E9E9E9
| 306759 ||  || — || December 30, 2000 || Socorro || LINEAR || — || align=right | 1.6 km || 
|-id=760 bgcolor=#fefefe
| 306760 ||  || — || December 30, 2000 || Socorro || LINEAR || — || align=right | 1.4 km || 
|-id=761 bgcolor=#E9E9E9
| 306761 ||  || — || December 29, 2000 || Anderson Mesa || LONEOS || — || align=right | 5.5 km || 
|-id=762 bgcolor=#E9E9E9
| 306762 ||  || — || January 2, 2001 || Socorro || LINEAR || — || align=right | 2.2 km || 
|-id=763 bgcolor=#E9E9E9
| 306763 ||  || — || January 2, 2001 || Socorro || LINEAR || — || align=right | 2.3 km || 
|-id=764 bgcolor=#E9E9E9
| 306764 ||  || — || January 3, 2001 || Socorro || LINEAR || — || align=right | 1.7 km || 
|-id=765 bgcolor=#E9E9E9
| 306765 ||  || — || January 3, 2001 || Socorro || LINEAR || — || align=right | 3.2 km || 
|-id=766 bgcolor=#d6d6d6
| 306766 ||  || — || January 4, 2001 || Fair Oaks Ranch || J. V. McClusky || Tj (2.99) || align=right | 5.3 km || 
|-id=767 bgcolor=#fefefe
| 306767 ||  || — || January 15, 2001 || Socorro || LINEAR || H || align=right data-sort-value="0.90" | 900 m || 
|-id=768 bgcolor=#E9E9E9
| 306768 ||  || — || January 15, 2001 || Kvistaberg || UDAS || — || align=right | 2.2 km || 
|-id=769 bgcolor=#FA8072
| 306769 ||  || — || January 18, 2001 || Socorro || LINEAR || — || align=right | 1.6 km || 
|-id=770 bgcolor=#E9E9E9
| 306770 ||  || — || January 18, 2001 || Socorro || LINEAR || — || align=right | 1.5 km || 
|-id=771 bgcolor=#d6d6d6
| 306771 ||  || — || January 20, 2001 || Socorro || LINEAR || TIR || align=right | 5.0 km || 
|-id=772 bgcolor=#FA8072
| 306772 ||  || — || February 1, 2001 || Socorro || LINEAR || — || align=right | 2.1 km || 
|-id=773 bgcolor=#d6d6d6
| 306773 ||  || — || February 15, 2001 || Socorro || LINEAR || — || align=right | 5.6 km || 
|-id=774 bgcolor=#E9E9E9
| 306774 ||  || — || February 17, 2001 || Socorro || LINEAR || — || align=right | 2.4 km || 
|-id=775 bgcolor=#fefefe
| 306775 ||  || — || February 19, 2001 || Socorro || LINEAR || MAS || align=right data-sort-value="0.92" | 920 m || 
|-id=776 bgcolor=#E9E9E9
| 306776 ||  || — || February 20, 2001 || Socorro || LINEAR || — || align=right | 5.1 km || 
|-id=777 bgcolor=#fefefe
| 306777 ||  || — || February 21, 2001 || Anderson Mesa || LONEOS || — || align=right | 1.4 km || 
|-id=778 bgcolor=#FA8072
| 306778 ||  || — || February 20, 2001 || Kitt Peak || Spacewatch || — || align=right | 3.4 km || 
|-id=779 bgcolor=#E9E9E9
| 306779 ||  || — || March 19, 2001 || Socorro || LINEAR || — || align=right | 1.6 km || 
|-id=780 bgcolor=#fefefe
| 306780 ||  || — || March 19, 2001 || Socorro || LINEAR || — || align=right | 1.3 km || 
|-id=781 bgcolor=#E9E9E9
| 306781 ||  || — || March 23, 2001 || Socorro || LINEAR || — || align=right | 3.2 km || 
|-id=782 bgcolor=#d6d6d6
| 306782 ||  || — || March 16, 2001 || Socorro || LINEAR || BRA || align=right | 2.5 km || 
|-id=783 bgcolor=#E9E9E9
| 306783 ||  || — || March 16, 2001 || Socorro || LINEAR || — || align=right | 2.7 km || 
|-id=784 bgcolor=#E9E9E9
| 306784 ||  || — || March 17, 2001 || Socorro || LINEAR || JUN || align=right | 1.2 km || 
|-id=785 bgcolor=#E9E9E9
| 306785 ||  || — || March 22, 2001 || Kitt Peak || SKADS || — || align=right data-sort-value="0.91" | 910 m || 
|-id=786 bgcolor=#fefefe
| 306786 ||  || — || April 14, 2001 || Socorro || LINEAR || PHO || align=right | 3.0 km || 
|-id=787 bgcolor=#FA8072
| 306787 ||  || — || April 22, 2001 || Socorro || LINEAR || — || align=right | 3.7 km || 
|-id=788 bgcolor=#FA8072
| 306788 ||  || — || April 27, 2001 || Kitt Peak || Spacewatch || — || align=right data-sort-value="0.86" | 860 m || 
|-id=789 bgcolor=#E9E9E9
| 306789 ||  || — || May 15, 2001 || Anderson Mesa || LONEOS || — || align=right | 2.4 km || 
|-id=790 bgcolor=#FA8072
| 306790 ||  || — || May 17, 2001 || Socorro || LINEAR || — || align=right | 3.0 km || 
|-id=791 bgcolor=#E9E9E9
| 306791 ||  || — || May 17, 2001 || Socorro || LINEAR || — || align=right | 2.0 km || 
|-id=792 bgcolor=#C2E0FF
| 306792 ||  || — || May 23, 2001 || Cerro Tololo || M. W. Buie || plutinocritical || align=right | 161 km || 
|-id=793 bgcolor=#E9E9E9
| 306793 ||  || — || June 27, 2001 || Palomar || NEAT || — || align=right | 3.8 km || 
|-id=794 bgcolor=#E9E9E9
| 306794 ||  || — || June 27, 2001 || Palomar || NEAT || — || align=right | 3.2 km || 
|-id=795 bgcolor=#FA8072
| 306795 ||  || — || July 26, 2001 || Palomar || NEAT || — || align=right | 3.5 km || 
|-id=796 bgcolor=#fefefe
| 306796 ||  || — || July 29, 2001 || Socorro || LINEAR || — || align=right data-sort-value="0.83" | 830 m || 
|-id=797 bgcolor=#E9E9E9
| 306797 ||  || — || July 25, 2001 || Haleakala || NEAT || — || align=right | 2.1 km || 
|-id=798 bgcolor=#FA8072
| 306798 ||  || — || July 20, 2001 || Mauna Kea || D. J. Tholen || — || align=right | 2.1 km || 
|-id=799 bgcolor=#E9E9E9
| 306799 ||  || — || August 10, 2001 || Palomar || NEAT || — || align=right | 2.9 km || 
|-id=800 bgcolor=#fefefe
| 306800 ||  || — || August 15, 2001 || Haleakala || NEAT || — || align=right | 1.4 km || 
|}

306801–306900 

|-bgcolor=#d6d6d6
| 306801 ||  || — || August 16, 2001 || Socorro || LINEAR || — || align=right | 4.9 km || 
|-id=802 bgcolor=#d6d6d6
| 306802 ||  || — || August 16, 2001 || Socorro || LINEAR || 3:2 || align=right | 7.8 km || 
|-id=803 bgcolor=#fefefe
| 306803 ||  || — || August 16, 2001 || Socorro || LINEAR || — || align=right data-sort-value="0.94" | 940 m || 
|-id=804 bgcolor=#fefefe
| 306804 ||  || — || August 16, 2001 || Socorro || LINEAR || NYS || align=right | 1.0 km || 
|-id=805 bgcolor=#FA8072
| 306805 ||  || — || August 17, 2001 || Socorro || LINEAR || — || align=right | 1.9 km || 
|-id=806 bgcolor=#E9E9E9
| 306806 ||  || — || August 16, 2001 || Palomar || NEAT || — || align=right | 2.0 km || 
|-id=807 bgcolor=#E9E9E9
| 306807 ||  || — || August 18, 2001 || Socorro || LINEAR || — || align=right | 1.8 km || 
|-id=808 bgcolor=#E9E9E9
| 306808 ||  || — || August 23, 2001 || Socorro || LINEAR || — || align=right | 1.6 km || 
|-id=809 bgcolor=#E9E9E9
| 306809 ||  || — || August 20, 2001 || Socorro || LINEAR || — || align=right | 1.7 km || 
|-id=810 bgcolor=#d6d6d6
| 306810 ||  || — || August 21, 2001 || Socorro || LINEAR || — || align=right | 5.4 km || 
|-id=811 bgcolor=#FA8072
| 306811 ||  || — || August 20, 2001 || Palomar || NEAT || — || align=right | 4.9 km || 
|-id=812 bgcolor=#E9E9E9
| 306812 ||  || — || August 23, 2001 || Socorro || LINEAR || GAL || align=right | 2.3 km || 
|-id=813 bgcolor=#fefefe
| 306813 ||  || — || August 23, 2001 || Anderson Mesa || LONEOS || V || align=right data-sort-value="0.88" | 880 m || 
|-id=814 bgcolor=#E9E9E9
| 306814 ||  || — || August 23, 2001 || Kitt Peak || Spacewatch || AGN || align=right | 1.2 km || 
|-id=815 bgcolor=#E9E9E9
| 306815 ||  || — || August 22, 2001 || Socorro || LINEAR || — || align=right | 1.8 km || 
|-id=816 bgcolor=#fefefe
| 306816 ||  || — || August 22, 2001 || Socorro || LINEAR || — || align=right | 1.5 km || 
|-id=817 bgcolor=#E9E9E9
| 306817 ||  || — || August 23, 2001 || Socorro || LINEAR || — || align=right | 1.6 km || 
|-id=818 bgcolor=#E9E9E9
| 306818 ||  || — || August 24, 2001 || Anderson Mesa || LONEOS || — || align=right | 2.7 km || 
|-id=819 bgcolor=#FA8072
| 306819 ||  || — || August 24, 2001 || Socorro || LINEAR || — || align=right data-sort-value="0.85" | 850 m || 
|-id=820 bgcolor=#fefefe
| 306820 ||  || — || August 25, 2001 || Socorro || LINEAR || — || align=right | 1.2 km || 
|-id=821 bgcolor=#E9E9E9
| 306821 ||  || — || August 20, 2001 || Socorro || LINEAR || — || align=right | 2.0 km || 
|-id=822 bgcolor=#fefefe
| 306822 ||  || — || August 24, 2001 || Anderson Mesa || LONEOS || — || align=right | 1.5 km || 
|-id=823 bgcolor=#fefefe
| 306823 ||  || — || August 27, 2001 || Anderson Mesa || LONEOS || FLO || align=right data-sort-value="0.61" | 610 m || 
|-id=824 bgcolor=#E9E9E9
| 306824 ||  || — || September 8, 2001 || Anderson Mesa || LONEOS || — || align=right | 2.4 km || 
|-id=825 bgcolor=#fefefe
| 306825 ||  || — || September 10, 2001 || Socorro || LINEAR || — || align=right data-sort-value="0.79" | 790 m || 
|-id=826 bgcolor=#FA8072
| 306826 ||  || — || September 11, 2001 || Socorro || LINEAR || — || align=right | 1.8 km || 
|-id=827 bgcolor=#d6d6d6
| 306827 ||  || — || September 7, 2001 || Socorro || LINEAR || — || align=right | 4.7 km || 
|-id=828 bgcolor=#fefefe
| 306828 ||  || — || September 8, 2001 || Socorro || LINEAR || — || align=right | 1.1 km || 
|-id=829 bgcolor=#E9E9E9
| 306829 ||  || — || September 10, 2001 || Socorro || LINEAR || — || align=right | 3.3 km || 
|-id=830 bgcolor=#E9E9E9
| 306830 ||  || — || September 11, 2001 || Socorro || LINEAR || — || align=right data-sort-value="0.91" | 910 m || 
|-id=831 bgcolor=#d6d6d6
| 306831 ||  || — || September 10, 2001 || Socorro || LINEAR || LAU || align=right | 1.5 km || 
|-id=832 bgcolor=#fefefe
| 306832 ||  || — || September 12, 2001 || Socorro || LINEAR || — || align=right data-sort-value="0.75" | 750 m || 
|-id=833 bgcolor=#E9E9E9
| 306833 ||  || — || September 15, 2001 || Palomar || NEAT || — || align=right | 1.1 km || 
|-id=834 bgcolor=#fefefe
| 306834 ||  || — || September 11, 2001 || Anderson Mesa || LONEOS || FLO || align=right data-sort-value="0.76" | 760 m || 
|-id=835 bgcolor=#d6d6d6
| 306835 ||  || — || September 17, 2001 || Desert Eagle || W. K. Y. Yeung || — || align=right | 2.1 km || 
|-id=836 bgcolor=#d6d6d6
| 306836 ||  || — || September 16, 2001 || Socorro || LINEAR || — || align=right | 2.6 km || 
|-id=837 bgcolor=#d6d6d6
| 306837 ||  || — || September 16, 2001 || Socorro || LINEAR || — || align=right | 3.2 km || 
|-id=838 bgcolor=#E9E9E9
| 306838 ||  || — || September 16, 2001 || Socorro || LINEAR || — || align=right | 2.4 km || 
|-id=839 bgcolor=#FA8072
| 306839 ||  || — || September 16, 2001 || Socorro || LINEAR || — || align=right data-sort-value="0.82" | 820 m || 
|-id=840 bgcolor=#fefefe
| 306840 ||  || — || September 16, 2001 || Socorro || LINEAR || — || align=right data-sort-value="0.89" | 890 m || 
|-id=841 bgcolor=#E9E9E9
| 306841 ||  || — || September 16, 2001 || Socorro || LINEAR || — || align=right | 2.1 km || 
|-id=842 bgcolor=#E9E9E9
| 306842 ||  || — || September 16, 2001 || Socorro || LINEAR || — || align=right data-sort-value="0.98" | 980 m || 
|-id=843 bgcolor=#fefefe
| 306843 ||  || — || September 17, 2001 || Socorro || LINEAR || — || align=right | 1.1 km || 
|-id=844 bgcolor=#E9E9E9
| 306844 ||  || — || September 17, 2001 || Socorro || LINEAR || — || align=right | 1.8 km || 
|-id=845 bgcolor=#E9E9E9
| 306845 ||  || — || September 19, 2001 || Anderson Mesa || LONEOS || — || align=right | 1.5 km || 
|-id=846 bgcolor=#E9E9E9
| 306846 ||  || — || September 19, 2001 || Socorro || LINEAR || — || align=right data-sort-value="0.88" | 880 m || 
|-id=847 bgcolor=#d6d6d6
| 306847 ||  || — || September 20, 2001 || Socorro || LINEAR || BRA || align=right | 2.0 km || 
|-id=848 bgcolor=#fefefe
| 306848 ||  || — || September 20, 2001 || Socorro || LINEAR || — || align=right data-sort-value="0.79" | 790 m || 
|-id=849 bgcolor=#E9E9E9
| 306849 ||  || — || September 20, 2001 || Socorro || LINEAR || — || align=right | 3.2 km || 
|-id=850 bgcolor=#E9E9E9
| 306850 ||  || — || September 16, 2001 || Socorro || LINEAR || — || align=right | 2.4 km || 
|-id=851 bgcolor=#fefefe
| 306851 ||  || — || September 16, 2001 || Socorro || LINEAR || — || align=right | 1.1 km || 
|-id=852 bgcolor=#E9E9E9
| 306852 ||  || — || September 16, 2001 || Socorro || LINEAR || — || align=right | 1.00 km || 
|-id=853 bgcolor=#fefefe
| 306853 ||  || — || September 16, 2001 || Socorro || LINEAR || FLO || align=right data-sort-value="0.82" | 820 m || 
|-id=854 bgcolor=#d6d6d6
| 306854 ||  || — || September 16, 2001 || Socorro || LINEAR || EOS || align=right | 2.7 km || 
|-id=855 bgcolor=#fefefe
| 306855 ||  || — || September 17, 2001 || Socorro || LINEAR || — || align=right | 1.0 km || 
|-id=856 bgcolor=#E9E9E9
| 306856 ||  || — || September 17, 2001 || Socorro || LINEAR || EUN || align=right | 2.0 km || 
|-id=857 bgcolor=#FA8072
| 306857 ||  || — || September 17, 2001 || Palomar || NEAT || — || align=right | 2.9 km || 
|-id=858 bgcolor=#E9E9E9
| 306858 ||  || — || September 19, 2001 || Socorro || LINEAR || — || align=right | 2.6 km || 
|-id=859 bgcolor=#E9E9E9
| 306859 ||  || — || September 19, 2001 || Socorro || LINEAR || — || align=right | 2.5 km || 
|-id=860 bgcolor=#fefefe
| 306860 ||  || — || September 19, 2001 || Socorro || LINEAR || — || align=right | 1.2 km || 
|-id=861 bgcolor=#d6d6d6
| 306861 ||  || — || September 19, 2001 || Socorro || LINEAR || CHA || align=right | 2.4 km || 
|-id=862 bgcolor=#E9E9E9
| 306862 ||  || — || September 19, 2001 || Socorro || LINEAR || — || align=right | 2.8 km || 
|-id=863 bgcolor=#E9E9E9
| 306863 ||  || — || September 19, 2001 || Socorro || LINEAR || — || align=right data-sort-value="0.98" | 980 m || 
|-id=864 bgcolor=#d6d6d6
| 306864 ||  || — || September 19, 2001 || Socorro || LINEAR || — || align=right | 4.2 km || 
|-id=865 bgcolor=#FA8072
| 306865 ||  || — || September 18, 2001 || Anderson Mesa || LONEOS || — || align=right | 3.2 km || 
|-id=866 bgcolor=#FA8072
| 306866 ||  || — || September 22, 2001 || Kitt Peak || Spacewatch || — || align=right | 3.9 km || 
|-id=867 bgcolor=#fefefe
| 306867 ||  || — || September 19, 2001 || Kitt Peak || Spacewatch || — || align=right data-sort-value="0.74" | 740 m || 
|-id=868 bgcolor=#fefefe
| 306868 ||  || — || September 21, 2001 || Socorro || LINEAR || — || align=right data-sort-value="0.81" | 810 m || 
|-id=869 bgcolor=#FA8072
| 306869 ||  || — || September 27, 2001 || Palomar || NEAT || — || align=right data-sort-value="0.83" | 830 m || 
|-id=870 bgcolor=#fefefe
| 306870 ||  || — || September 21, 2001 || Anderson Mesa || LONEOS || — || align=right | 1.4 km || 
|-id=871 bgcolor=#fefefe
| 306871 ||  || — || September 25, 2001 || Palomar || NEAT || — || align=right | 1.3 km || 
|-id=872 bgcolor=#E9E9E9
| 306872 ||  || — || September 25, 2001 || Socorro || LINEAR || — || align=right | 1.4 km || 
|-id=873 bgcolor=#d6d6d6
| 306873 ||  || — || September 18, 2001 || Anderson Mesa || LONEOS || — || align=right | 2.9 km || 
|-id=874 bgcolor=#E9E9E9
| 306874 ||  || — || September 20, 2001 || Socorro || LINEAR || — || align=right | 2.1 km || 
|-id=875 bgcolor=#E9E9E9
| 306875 ||  || — || September 20, 2001 || Kitt Peak || Spacewatch || AGN || align=right | 1.4 km || 
|-id=876 bgcolor=#FA8072
| 306876 ||  || — || October 8, 2001 || Palomar || NEAT || — || align=right | 1.8 km || 
|-id=877 bgcolor=#fefefe
| 306877 ||  || — || October 10, 2001 || Palomar || NEAT || SUL || align=right | 2.7 km || 
|-id=878 bgcolor=#fefefe
| 306878 ||  || — || October 7, 2001 || Palomar || NEAT || — || align=right data-sort-value="0.95" | 950 m || 
|-id=879 bgcolor=#fefefe
| 306879 ||  || — || October 11, 2001 || Socorro || LINEAR || V || align=right data-sort-value="0.84" | 840 m || 
|-id=880 bgcolor=#d6d6d6
| 306880 ||  || — || October 14, 2001 || Socorro || LINEAR || — || align=right | 2.1 km || 
|-id=881 bgcolor=#fefefe
| 306881 ||  || — || October 14, 2001 || Socorro || LINEAR || FLO || align=right data-sort-value="0.92" | 920 m || 
|-id=882 bgcolor=#E9E9E9
| 306882 ||  || — || October 14, 2001 || Socorro || LINEAR || JUN || align=right | 1.6 km || 
|-id=883 bgcolor=#E9E9E9
| 306883 ||  || — || October 14, 2001 || Socorro || LINEAR || — || align=right | 2.0 km || 
|-id=884 bgcolor=#d6d6d6
| 306884 ||  || — || October 13, 2001 || Socorro || LINEAR || — || align=right | 4.1 km || 
|-id=885 bgcolor=#E9E9E9
| 306885 ||  || — || October 13, 2001 || Socorro || LINEAR || — || align=right | 1.3 km || 
|-id=886 bgcolor=#FA8072
| 306886 ||  || — || October 13, 2001 || Socorro || LINEAR || — || align=right data-sort-value="0.75" | 750 m || 
|-id=887 bgcolor=#E9E9E9
| 306887 ||  || — || October 13, 2001 || Socorro || LINEAR || — || align=right | 1.5 km || 
|-id=888 bgcolor=#E9E9E9
| 306888 ||  || — || October 14, 2001 || Socorro || LINEAR || — || align=right data-sort-value="0.97" | 970 m || 
|-id=889 bgcolor=#fefefe
| 306889 ||  || — || October 14, 2001 || Socorro || LINEAR || — || align=right | 1.5 km || 
|-id=890 bgcolor=#d6d6d6
| 306890 ||  || — || October 14, 2001 || Socorro || LINEAR || — || align=right | 4.0 km || 
|-id=891 bgcolor=#fefefe
| 306891 ||  || — || October 14, 2001 || Socorro || LINEAR || — || align=right | 1.0 km || 
|-id=892 bgcolor=#fefefe
| 306892 ||  || — || October 15, 2001 || Desert Eagle || W. K. Y. Yeung || V || align=right | 1.0 km || 
|-id=893 bgcolor=#E9E9E9
| 306893 ||  || — || October 15, 2001 || Socorro || LINEAR || — || align=right | 1.9 km || 
|-id=894 bgcolor=#d6d6d6
| 306894 ||  || — || October 15, 2001 || Socorro || LINEAR || BRA || align=right | 2.3 km || 
|-id=895 bgcolor=#FA8072
| 306895 ||  || — || October 15, 2001 || Socorro || LINEAR || — || align=right | 1.6 km || 
|-id=896 bgcolor=#E9E9E9
| 306896 ||  || — || October 10, 2001 || Palomar || NEAT || — || align=right | 1.9 km || 
|-id=897 bgcolor=#d6d6d6
| 306897 ||  || — || October 10, 2001 || Palomar || NEAT || EOS || align=right | 2.7 km || 
|-id=898 bgcolor=#d6d6d6
| 306898 ||  || — || October 15, 2001 || Kitt Peak || Spacewatch || — || align=right | 2.6 km || 
|-id=899 bgcolor=#d6d6d6
| 306899 ||  || — || October 11, 2001 || Palomar || NEAT || EOS || align=right | 2.6 km || 
|-id=900 bgcolor=#E9E9E9
| 306900 ||  || — || October 15, 2001 || Socorro || LINEAR || — || align=right | 1.9 km || 
|}

306901–307000 

|-bgcolor=#E9E9E9
| 306901 ||  || — || October 15, 2001 || Socorro || LINEAR || KRM || align=right | 3.6 km || 
|-id=902 bgcolor=#fefefe
| 306902 ||  || — || October 13, 2001 || Anderson Mesa || LONEOS || — || align=right | 1.4 km || 
|-id=903 bgcolor=#fefefe
| 306903 ||  || — || October 13, 2001 || Socorro || LINEAR || NYS || align=right data-sort-value="0.95" | 950 m || 
|-id=904 bgcolor=#d6d6d6
| 306904 ||  || — || October 15, 2001 || Socorro || LINEAR || — || align=right | 4.4 km || 
|-id=905 bgcolor=#E9E9E9
| 306905 ||  || — || October 14, 2001 || Socorro || LINEAR || — || align=right | 1.1 km || 
|-id=906 bgcolor=#E9E9E9
| 306906 ||  || — || October 14, 2001 || Socorro || LINEAR || — || align=right data-sort-value="0.87" | 870 m || 
|-id=907 bgcolor=#d6d6d6
| 306907 ||  || — || October 14, 2001 || Socorro || LINEAR || — || align=right | 4.6 km || 
|-id=908 bgcolor=#d6d6d6
| 306908 ||  || — || October 14, 2001 || Socorro || LINEAR || — || align=right | 4.5 km || 
|-id=909 bgcolor=#E9E9E9
| 306909 ||  || — || October 11, 2001 || Kitt Peak || Spacewatch || — || align=right | 1.1 km || 
|-id=910 bgcolor=#fefefe
| 306910 ||  || — || October 11, 2001 || Socorro || LINEAR || FLO || align=right data-sort-value="0.67" | 670 m || 
|-id=911 bgcolor=#E9E9E9
| 306911 ||  || — || October 12, 2001 || Anderson Mesa || LONEOS || MAR || align=right | 1.3 km || 
|-id=912 bgcolor=#d6d6d6
| 306912 ||  || — || October 13, 2001 || Goodricke-Pigott || R. A. Tucker || — || align=right | 3.5 km || 
|-id=913 bgcolor=#E9E9E9
| 306913 ||  || — || October 13, 2001 || Palomar || NEAT || — || align=right | 1.6 km || 
|-id=914 bgcolor=#E9E9E9
| 306914 ||  || — || October 14, 2001 || Palomar || NEAT || — || align=right | 2.2 km || 
|-id=915 bgcolor=#E9E9E9
| 306915 ||  || — || October 15, 2001 || Palomar || NEAT || MAR || align=right | 1.4 km || 
|-id=916 bgcolor=#E9E9E9
| 306916 ||  || — || October 10, 2001 || Kitt Peak || Spacewatch || — || align=right data-sort-value="0.98" | 980 m || 
|-id=917 bgcolor=#FA8072
| 306917 ||  || — || October 20, 2001 || Palomar || NEAT || — || align=right data-sort-value="0.51" | 510 m || 
|-id=918 bgcolor=#FA8072
| 306918 ||  || — || October 23, 2001 || Socorro || LINEAR || unusual || align=right | 1.6 km || 
|-id=919 bgcolor=#FA8072
| 306919 ||  || — || October 19, 2001 || Palomar || NEAT || — || align=right | 2.7 km || 
|-id=920 bgcolor=#fefefe
| 306920 ||  || — || October 18, 2001 || Socorro || LINEAR || — || align=right | 1.2 km || 
|-id=921 bgcolor=#fefefe
| 306921 ||  || — || October 16, 2001 || Socorro || LINEAR || — || align=right | 1.1 km || 
|-id=922 bgcolor=#E9E9E9
| 306922 ||  || — || October 16, 2001 || Socorro || LINEAR || EUN || align=right | 1.5 km || 
|-id=923 bgcolor=#E9E9E9
| 306923 ||  || — || October 16, 2001 || Socorro || LINEAR || ADE || align=right | 2.3 km || 
|-id=924 bgcolor=#fefefe
| 306924 ||  || — || October 17, 2001 || Socorro || LINEAR || MAS || align=right | 1.1 km || 
|-id=925 bgcolor=#d6d6d6
| 306925 ||  || — || October 17, 2001 || Socorro || LINEAR || — || align=right | 3.1 km || 
|-id=926 bgcolor=#E9E9E9
| 306926 ||  || — || October 17, 2001 || Socorro || LINEAR || — || align=right | 1.8 km || 
|-id=927 bgcolor=#d6d6d6
| 306927 ||  || — || October 17, 2001 || Socorro || LINEAR || 628 || align=right | 2.0 km || 
|-id=928 bgcolor=#E9E9E9
| 306928 ||  || — || October 17, 2001 || Socorro || LINEAR || — || align=right | 1.0 km || 
|-id=929 bgcolor=#E9E9E9
| 306929 ||  || — || October 20, 2001 || Socorro || LINEAR || — || align=right | 1.1 km || 
|-id=930 bgcolor=#d6d6d6
| 306930 ||  || — || October 20, 2001 || Socorro || LINEAR || LAU || align=right | 1.3 km || 
|-id=931 bgcolor=#E9E9E9
| 306931 ||  || — || October 21, 2001 || Kitt Peak || Spacewatch || NEM || align=right | 3.2 km || 
|-id=932 bgcolor=#d6d6d6
| 306932 ||  || — || October 22, 2001 || Palomar || NEAT || — || align=right | 5.0 km || 
|-id=933 bgcolor=#fefefe
| 306933 ||  || — || October 23, 2001 || Kitt Peak || Spacewatch || — || align=right | 1.0 km || 
|-id=934 bgcolor=#d6d6d6
| 306934 ||  || — || October 19, 2001 || Palomar || NEAT || — || align=right | 3.5 km || 
|-id=935 bgcolor=#E9E9E9
| 306935 ||  || — || October 17, 2001 || Socorro || LINEAR || — || align=right | 1.7 km || 
|-id=936 bgcolor=#d6d6d6
| 306936 ||  || — || October 20, 2001 || Socorro || LINEAR || EOS || align=right | 2.7 km || 
|-id=937 bgcolor=#fefefe
| 306937 ||  || — || October 20, 2001 || Socorro || LINEAR || — || align=right | 1.0 km || 
|-id=938 bgcolor=#d6d6d6
| 306938 ||  || — || October 20, 2001 || Socorro || LINEAR || EOS || align=right | 2.5 km || 
|-id=939 bgcolor=#E9E9E9
| 306939 ||  || — || October 20, 2001 || Socorro || LINEAR || — || align=right | 1.6 km || 
|-id=940 bgcolor=#fefefe
| 306940 ||  || — || October 21, 2001 || Socorro || LINEAR || — || align=right data-sort-value="0.73" | 730 m || 
|-id=941 bgcolor=#fefefe
| 306941 ||  || — || October 21, 2001 || Socorro || LINEAR || — || align=right data-sort-value="0.84" | 840 m || 
|-id=942 bgcolor=#fefefe
| 306942 ||  || — || October 20, 2001 || Socorro || LINEAR || — || align=right data-sort-value="0.99" | 990 m || 
|-id=943 bgcolor=#fefefe
| 306943 ||  || — || October 20, 2001 || Socorro || LINEAR || — || align=right | 1.4 km || 
|-id=944 bgcolor=#fefefe
| 306944 ||  || — || October 22, 2001 || Socorro || LINEAR || — || align=right | 1.1 km || 
|-id=945 bgcolor=#E9E9E9
| 306945 ||  || — || October 22, 2001 || Socorro || LINEAR || — || align=right | 1.3 km || 
|-id=946 bgcolor=#E9E9E9
| 306946 ||  || — || October 22, 2001 || Socorro || LINEAR || MAR || align=right | 1.3 km || 
|-id=947 bgcolor=#E9E9E9
| 306947 ||  || — || October 23, 2001 || Socorro || LINEAR || — || align=right | 1.1 km || 
|-id=948 bgcolor=#E9E9E9
| 306948 ||  || — || October 23, 2001 || Socorro || LINEAR || HNS || align=right | 1.5 km || 
|-id=949 bgcolor=#E9E9E9
| 306949 ||  || — || October 23, 2001 || Socorro || LINEAR || — || align=right | 2.3 km || 
|-id=950 bgcolor=#E9E9E9
| 306950 ||  || — || October 18, 2001 || Socorro || LINEAR || — || align=right | 1.0 km || 
|-id=951 bgcolor=#E9E9E9
| 306951 ||  || — || October 21, 2001 || Socorro || LINEAR || — || align=right | 1.2 km || 
|-id=952 bgcolor=#E9E9E9
| 306952 ||  || — || October 25, 2001 || Kitt Peak || Spacewatch || — || align=right | 1.2 km || 
|-id=953 bgcolor=#d6d6d6
| 306953 ||  || — || October 24, 2001 || Palomar || NEAT || — || align=right | 3.2 km || 
|-id=954 bgcolor=#E9E9E9
| 306954 ||  || — || October 16, 2001 || Palomar || NEAT || — || align=right | 1.5 km || 
|-id=955 bgcolor=#E9E9E9
| 306955 ||  || — || October 17, 2001 || Socorro || LINEAR || — || align=right | 1.2 km || 
|-id=956 bgcolor=#E9E9E9
| 306956 ||  || — || October 18, 2001 || Socorro || LINEAR || MAR || align=right | 1.4 km || 
|-id=957 bgcolor=#fefefe
| 306957 ||  || — || October 20, 2001 || Palomar || NEAT || — || align=right data-sort-value="0.88" | 880 m || 
|-id=958 bgcolor=#E9E9E9
| 306958 ||  || — || October 22, 2001 || Socorro || LINEAR || — || align=right data-sort-value="0.98" | 980 m || 
|-id=959 bgcolor=#E9E9E9
| 306959 ||  || — || October 19, 2001 || Palomar || NEAT || — || align=right | 1.1 km || 
|-id=960 bgcolor=#E9E9E9
| 306960 ||  || — || October 24, 2001 || Socorro || LINEAR || — || align=right | 1.2 km || 
|-id=961 bgcolor=#E9E9E9
| 306961 ||  || — || October 21, 2001 || Kitt Peak || Spacewatch || — || align=right data-sort-value="0.96" | 960 m || 
|-id=962 bgcolor=#E9E9E9
| 306962 ||  || — || October 16, 2001 || Palomar || NEAT || — || align=right | 3.6 km || 
|-id=963 bgcolor=#fefefe
| 306963 ||  || — || November 11, 2001 || Socorro || LINEAR || — || align=right | 1.0 km || 
|-id=964 bgcolor=#fefefe
| 306964 ||  || — || November 9, 2001 || Socorro || LINEAR || FLO || align=right | 1.00 km || 
|-id=965 bgcolor=#fefefe
| 306965 ||  || — || November 9, 2001 || Socorro || LINEAR || — || align=right | 1.1 km || 
|-id=966 bgcolor=#E9E9E9
| 306966 ||  || — || November 9, 2001 || Socorro || LINEAR || — || align=right | 1.3 km || 
|-id=967 bgcolor=#d6d6d6
| 306967 ||  || — || November 9, 2001 || Socorro || LINEAR || ELF || align=right | 7.2 km || 
|-id=968 bgcolor=#E9E9E9
| 306968 ||  || — || November 9, 2001 || Socorro || LINEAR || — || align=right | 1.3 km || 
|-id=969 bgcolor=#fefefe
| 306969 ||  || — || November 10, 2001 || Socorro || LINEAR || — || align=right | 1.0 km || 
|-id=970 bgcolor=#d6d6d6
| 306970 ||  || — || November 10, 2001 || Socorro || LINEAR || — || align=right | 4.8 km || 
|-id=971 bgcolor=#E9E9E9
| 306971 ||  || — || November 10, 2001 || Socorro || LINEAR || — || align=right | 1.6 km || 
|-id=972 bgcolor=#d6d6d6
| 306972 ||  || — || November 10, 2001 || Socorro || LINEAR || TRP || align=right | 3.3 km || 
|-id=973 bgcolor=#fefefe
| 306973 ||  || — || November 10, 2001 || Socorro || LINEAR || — || align=right | 1.1 km || 
|-id=974 bgcolor=#d6d6d6
| 306974 ||  || — || November 12, 2001 || Socorro || LINEAR || — || align=right | 3.5 km || 
|-id=975 bgcolor=#fefefe
| 306975 ||  || — || November 12, 2001 || Socorro || LINEAR || H || align=right | 1.1 km || 
|-id=976 bgcolor=#fefefe
| 306976 ||  || — || November 11, 2001 || Socorro || LINEAR || — || align=right | 4.4 km || 
|-id=977 bgcolor=#E9E9E9
| 306977 ||  || — || November 15, 2001 || Ondřejov || P. Pravec, P. Kušnirák || — || align=right | 3.6 km || 
|-id=978 bgcolor=#E9E9E9
| 306978 ||  || — || November 12, 2001 || Socorro || LINEAR || — || align=right | 2.2 km || 
|-id=979 bgcolor=#fefefe
| 306979 ||  || — || November 12, 2001 || Socorro || LINEAR || — || align=right | 3.0 km || 
|-id=980 bgcolor=#fefefe
| 306980 ||  || — || November 12, 2001 || Socorro || LINEAR || FLO || align=right data-sort-value="0.78" | 780 m || 
|-id=981 bgcolor=#E9E9E9
| 306981 ||  || — || November 12, 2001 || Socorro || LINEAR || — || align=right | 2.3 km || 
|-id=982 bgcolor=#fefefe
| 306982 ||  || — || November 12, 2001 || Socorro || LINEAR || — || align=right | 1.8 km || 
|-id=983 bgcolor=#d6d6d6
| 306983 ||  || — || November 12, 2001 || Socorro || LINEAR || VER || align=right | 4.0 km || 
|-id=984 bgcolor=#d6d6d6
| 306984 ||  || — || November 12, 2001 || Socorro || LINEAR || — || align=right | 3.9 km || 
|-id=985 bgcolor=#E9E9E9
| 306985 ||  || — || November 12, 2001 || Socorro || LINEAR || — || align=right | 1.7 km || 
|-id=986 bgcolor=#E9E9E9
| 306986 ||  || — || November 12, 2001 || Socorro || LINEAR || — || align=right | 1.8 km || 
|-id=987 bgcolor=#fefefe
| 306987 ||  || — || November 12, 2001 || Socorro || LINEAR || — || align=right data-sort-value="0.96" | 960 m || 
|-id=988 bgcolor=#E9E9E9
| 306988 ||  || — || November 14, 2001 || Kitt Peak || Spacewatch || — || align=right data-sort-value="0.82" | 820 m || 
|-id=989 bgcolor=#E9E9E9
| 306989 ||  || — || November 17, 2001 || Socorro || LINEAR || — || align=right | 1.3 km || 
|-id=990 bgcolor=#E9E9E9
| 306990 ||  || — || November 17, 2001 || Socorro || LINEAR || — || align=right data-sort-value="0.99" | 990 m || 
|-id=991 bgcolor=#E9E9E9
| 306991 ||  || — || November 17, 2001 || Socorro || LINEAR || EUN || align=right | 1.4 km || 
|-id=992 bgcolor=#E9E9E9
| 306992 ||  || — || November 17, 2001 || Socorro || LINEAR || — || align=right | 1.3 km || 
|-id=993 bgcolor=#E9E9E9
| 306993 ||  || — || November 17, 2001 || Socorro || LINEAR || — || align=right | 1.7 km || 
|-id=994 bgcolor=#E9E9E9
| 306994 ||  || — || November 17, 2001 || Socorro || LINEAR || — || align=right | 3.1 km || 
|-id=995 bgcolor=#fefefe
| 306995 ||  || — || November 20, 2001 || Socorro || LINEAR || — || align=right data-sort-value="0.94" | 940 m || 
|-id=996 bgcolor=#fefefe
| 306996 ||  || — || November 19, 2001 || Socorro || LINEAR || — || align=right data-sort-value="0.67" | 670 m || 
|-id=997 bgcolor=#E9E9E9
| 306997 ||  || — || November 19, 2001 || Socorro || LINEAR || — || align=right | 1.1 km || 
|-id=998 bgcolor=#E9E9E9
| 306998 ||  || — || November 19, 2001 || Socorro || LINEAR || — || align=right | 1.2 km || 
|-id=999 bgcolor=#d6d6d6
| 306999 ||  || — || November 20, 2001 || Socorro || LINEAR || — || align=right | 3.3 km || 
|-id=000 bgcolor=#fefefe
| 307000 ||  || — || November 20, 2001 || Socorro || LINEAR || NYS || align=right data-sort-value="0.63" | 630 m || 
|}

References

External links 
 Discovery Circumstances: Numbered Minor Planets (305001)–(310000) (IAU Minor Planet Center)

0306